

251001–251100 

|-bgcolor=#fefefe
| 251001 Sluch ||  ||  || July 28, 2006 || Andrushivka || Andrushivka Obs. || — || align=right | 3.0 km || 
|-id=002 bgcolor=#E9E9E9
| 251002 ||  || — || July 21, 2006 || Mount Lemmon || Mount Lemmon Survey || — || align=right | 1.3 km || 
|-id=003 bgcolor=#fefefe
| 251003 || 2006 PB || — || August 1, 2006 || Pla D'Arguines || R. Ferrando || — || align=right | 1.3 km || 
|-id=004 bgcolor=#fefefe
| 251004 ||  || — || August 12, 2006 || Palomar || NEAT || NYS || align=right data-sort-value="0.82" | 820 m || 
|-id=005 bgcolor=#fefefe
| 251005 ||  || — || August 13, 2006 || Palomar || NEAT || NYS || align=right | 1.1 km || 
|-id=006 bgcolor=#fefefe
| 251006 ||  || — || August 13, 2006 || Palomar || NEAT || — || align=right | 1.4 km || 
|-id=007 bgcolor=#fefefe
| 251007 ||  || — || August 15, 2006 || Palomar || NEAT || — || align=right | 1.1 km || 
|-id=008 bgcolor=#fefefe
| 251008 ||  || — || August 13, 2006 || Palomar || NEAT || — || align=right | 1.3 km || 
|-id=009 bgcolor=#fefefe
| 251009 ||  || — || August 12, 2006 || Palomar || NEAT || — || align=right | 1.1 km || 
|-id=010 bgcolor=#fefefe
| 251010 ||  || — || August 14, 2006 || Siding Spring || SSS || KLI || align=right | 2.2 km || 
|-id=011 bgcolor=#E9E9E9
| 251011 ||  || — || August 15, 2006 || Palomar || NEAT || BRU || align=right | 3.8 km || 
|-id=012 bgcolor=#fefefe
| 251012 ||  || — || August 14, 2006 || Palomar || NEAT || ERI || align=right | 2.1 km || 
|-id=013 bgcolor=#fefefe
| 251013 ||  || — || August 14, 2006 || Palomar || NEAT || — || align=right data-sort-value="0.90" | 900 m || 
|-id=014 bgcolor=#fefefe
| 251014 ||  || — || August 18, 2006 || Piszkéstető || K. Sárneczky, Z. Kuli || NYS || align=right data-sort-value="0.98" | 980 m || 
|-id=015 bgcolor=#d6d6d6
| 251015 ||  || — || August 19, 2006 || Piszkéstető || K. Sárneczky, Z. Kuli || — || align=right | 3.9 km || 
|-id=016 bgcolor=#fefefe
| 251016 ||  || — || August 19, 2006 || Palomar || NEAT || NYS || align=right | 1.6 km || 
|-id=017 bgcolor=#fefefe
| 251017 ||  || — || August 20, 2006 || Palomar || NEAT || NYS || align=right data-sort-value="0.92" | 920 m || 
|-id=018 bgcolor=#fefefe
| 251018 Liubirena ||  ||  || August 16, 2006 || Andrushivka || Andrushivka Obs. || NYS || align=right | 1.0 km || 
|-id=019 bgcolor=#fefefe
| 251019 ||  || — || August 18, 2006 || Socorro || LINEAR || — || align=right | 1.0 km || 
|-id=020 bgcolor=#fefefe
| 251020 ||  || — || August 17, 2006 || Palomar || NEAT || NYS || align=right | 1.0 km || 
|-id=021 bgcolor=#fefefe
| 251021 ||  || — || August 16, 2006 || Siding Spring || SSS || — || align=right | 1.3 km || 
|-id=022 bgcolor=#E9E9E9
| 251022 ||  || — || August 19, 2006 || Anderson Mesa || LONEOS || IAN || align=right | 1.5 km || 
|-id=023 bgcolor=#fefefe
| 251023 ||  || — || August 20, 2006 || Palomar || NEAT || NYS || align=right | 1.2 km || 
|-id=024 bgcolor=#fefefe
| 251024 ||  || — || August 23, 2006 || Palomar || NEAT || V || align=right data-sort-value="0.97" | 970 m || 
|-id=025 bgcolor=#fefefe
| 251025 ||  || — || August 20, 2006 || Palomar || NEAT || NYS || align=right data-sort-value="0.84" | 840 m || 
|-id=026 bgcolor=#fefefe
| 251026 ||  || — || August 20, 2006 || Palomar || NEAT || MAS || align=right | 1.3 km || 
|-id=027 bgcolor=#E9E9E9
| 251027 ||  || — || August 21, 2006 || Socorro || LINEAR || — || align=right | 1.5 km || 
|-id=028 bgcolor=#fefefe
| 251028 ||  || — || August 24, 2006 || Socorro || LINEAR || — || align=right | 1.1 km || 
|-id=029 bgcolor=#fefefe
| 251029 ||  || — || August 16, 2006 || Palomar || NEAT || MAS || align=right data-sort-value="0.91" | 910 m || 
|-id=030 bgcolor=#d6d6d6
| 251030 ||  || — || August 16, 2006 || Palomar || NEAT || — || align=right | 4.5 km || 
|-id=031 bgcolor=#fefefe
| 251031 ||  || — || August 19, 2006 || Palomar || NEAT || NYS || align=right data-sort-value="0.98" | 980 m || 
|-id=032 bgcolor=#E9E9E9
| 251032 ||  || — || August 25, 2006 || Socorro || LINEAR || — || align=right | 2.1 km || 
|-id=033 bgcolor=#E9E9E9
| 251033 ||  || — || August 29, 2006 || Catalina || CSS || — || align=right | 2.1 km || 
|-id=034 bgcolor=#fefefe
| 251034 ||  || — || August 16, 2006 || Palomar || NEAT || — || align=right | 2.4 km || 
|-id=035 bgcolor=#E9E9E9
| 251035 ||  || — || August 16, 2006 || Palomar || NEAT || — || align=right | 1.4 km || 
|-id=036 bgcolor=#fefefe
| 251036 ||  || — || August 17, 2006 || Palomar || NEAT || — || align=right | 1.6 km || 
|-id=037 bgcolor=#fefefe
| 251037 ||  || — || August 18, 2006 || Palomar || NEAT || — || align=right data-sort-value="0.98" | 980 m || 
|-id=038 bgcolor=#E9E9E9
| 251038 ||  || — || August 29, 2006 || Anderson Mesa || LONEOS || — || align=right | 2.3 km || 
|-id=039 bgcolor=#E9E9E9
| 251039 ||  || — || August 29, 2006 || Catalina || CSS || — || align=right | 2.4 km || 
|-id=040 bgcolor=#E9E9E9
| 251040 ||  || — || September 11, 2006 || Catalina || CSS || — || align=right | 1.0 km || 
|-id=041 bgcolor=#E9E9E9
| 251041 ||  || — || September 14, 2006 || Palomar || NEAT || — || align=right | 1.3 km || 
|-id=042 bgcolor=#E9E9E9
| 251042 ||  || — || September 14, 2006 || Palomar || NEAT || — || align=right | 2.2 km || 
|-id=043 bgcolor=#E9E9E9
| 251043 ||  || — || September 14, 2006 || Palomar || NEAT || — || align=right | 1.6 km || 
|-id=044 bgcolor=#E9E9E9
| 251044 ||  || — || September 14, 2006 || Palomar || NEAT || — || align=right | 3.4 km || 
|-id=045 bgcolor=#E9E9E9
| 251045 ||  || — || September 15, 2006 || Kitt Peak || Spacewatch || — || align=right | 1.4 km || 
|-id=046 bgcolor=#E9E9E9
| 251046 ||  || — || September 14, 2006 || Kitt Peak || Spacewatch || — || align=right | 1.9 km || 
|-id=047 bgcolor=#E9E9E9
| 251047 ||  || — || September 14, 2006 || Kitt Peak || Spacewatch || — || align=right | 1.7 km || 
|-id=048 bgcolor=#E9E9E9
| 251048 ||  || — || September 14, 2006 || Kitt Peak || Spacewatch || — || align=right | 3.2 km || 
|-id=049 bgcolor=#E9E9E9
| 251049 ||  || — || September 14, 2006 || Kitt Peak || Spacewatch || MAR || align=right | 1.8 km || 
|-id=050 bgcolor=#E9E9E9
| 251050 ||  || — || September 15, 2006 || Kitt Peak || Spacewatch || — || align=right | 1.8 km || 
|-id=051 bgcolor=#E9E9E9
| 251051 ||  || — || September 15, 2006 || Kitt Peak || Spacewatch || — || align=right | 1.7 km || 
|-id=052 bgcolor=#d6d6d6
| 251052 ||  || — || September 14, 2006 || Palomar || NEAT || — || align=right | 4.0 km || 
|-id=053 bgcolor=#E9E9E9
| 251053 ||  || — || September 12, 2006 || Catalina || CSS || — || align=right | 1.3 km || 
|-id=054 bgcolor=#E9E9E9
| 251054 ||  || — || September 15, 2006 || Kitt Peak || Spacewatch || — || align=right | 1.3 km || 
|-id=055 bgcolor=#E9E9E9
| 251055 ||  || — || September 15, 2006 || Kitt Peak || Spacewatch || — || align=right | 1.5 km || 
|-id=056 bgcolor=#E9E9E9
| 251056 ||  || — || September 15, 2006 || Kitt Peak || Spacewatch || — || align=right | 2.2 km || 
|-id=057 bgcolor=#E9E9E9
| 251057 ||  || — || September 15, 2006 || Kitt Peak || Spacewatch || — || align=right | 1.5 km || 
|-id=058 bgcolor=#E9E9E9
| 251058 || 2006 SU || — || September 16, 2006 || Goodricke-Pigott || R. A. Tucker || — || align=right | 2.6 km || 
|-id=059 bgcolor=#E9E9E9
| 251059 ||  || — || September 16, 2006 || Catalina || CSS || — || align=right | 2.1 km || 
|-id=060 bgcolor=#E9E9E9
| 251060 ||  || — || September 16, 2006 || Anderson Mesa || LONEOS || — || align=right | 3.4 km || 
|-id=061 bgcolor=#E9E9E9
| 251061 ||  || — || September 17, 2006 || Catalina || CSS || — || align=right | 1.2 km || 
|-id=062 bgcolor=#E9E9E9
| 251062 ||  || — || September 17, 2006 || Kitt Peak || Spacewatch || — || align=right | 2.6 km || 
|-id=063 bgcolor=#fefefe
| 251063 ||  || — || September 17, 2006 || Anderson Mesa || LONEOS || — || align=right | 1.5 km || 
|-id=064 bgcolor=#E9E9E9
| 251064 ||  || — || September 17, 2006 || Anderson Mesa || LONEOS || — || align=right | 4.0 km || 
|-id=065 bgcolor=#E9E9E9
| 251065 ||  || — || September 16, 2006 || Catalina || CSS || — || align=right | 2.8 km || 
|-id=066 bgcolor=#E9E9E9
| 251066 ||  || — || September 16, 2006 || Catalina || CSS || — || align=right | 3.0 km || 
|-id=067 bgcolor=#E9E9E9
| 251067 ||  || — || September 17, 2006 || Catalina || CSS || — || align=right | 1.2 km || 
|-id=068 bgcolor=#E9E9E9
| 251068 ||  || — || September 17, 2006 || Kitt Peak || Spacewatch || — || align=right | 1.1 km || 
|-id=069 bgcolor=#E9E9E9
| 251069 ||  || — || September 17, 2006 || Kitt Peak || Spacewatch || — || align=right | 1.1 km || 
|-id=070 bgcolor=#E9E9E9
| 251070 ||  || — || September 18, 2006 || Catalina || CSS || — || align=right | 1.2 km || 
|-id=071 bgcolor=#E9E9E9
| 251071 ||  || — || September 18, 2006 || Kitt Peak || Spacewatch || — || align=right | 1.3 km || 
|-id=072 bgcolor=#E9E9E9
| 251072 ||  || — || September 17, 2006 || Anderson Mesa || LONEOS || RAF || align=right | 1.6 km || 
|-id=073 bgcolor=#E9E9E9
| 251073 ||  || — || September 19, 2006 || Antares || ARO || — || align=right | 2.6 km || 
|-id=074 bgcolor=#E9E9E9
| 251074 ||  || — || September 19, 2006 || Kitt Peak || Spacewatch || BRU || align=right | 2.5 km || 
|-id=075 bgcolor=#E9E9E9
| 251075 ||  || — || September 19, 2006 || Kitt Peak || Spacewatch || EUN || align=right | 1.4 km || 
|-id=076 bgcolor=#E9E9E9
| 251076 ||  || — || September 19, 2006 || Kitt Peak || Spacewatch || — || align=right | 2.4 km || 
|-id=077 bgcolor=#E9E9E9
| 251077 ||  || — || September 16, 2006 || Catalina || CSS || — || align=right | 2.0 km || 
|-id=078 bgcolor=#E9E9E9
| 251078 ||  || — || September 17, 2006 || Catalina || CSS || — || align=right | 2.8 km || 
|-id=079 bgcolor=#E9E9E9
| 251079 ||  || — || September 18, 2006 || Kitt Peak || Spacewatch || — || align=right | 1.5 km || 
|-id=080 bgcolor=#E9E9E9
| 251080 ||  || — || September 18, 2006 || Kitt Peak || Spacewatch || — || align=right | 1.2 km || 
|-id=081 bgcolor=#E9E9E9
| 251081 ||  || — || September 18, 2006 || Kitt Peak || Spacewatch || — || align=right | 1.5 km || 
|-id=082 bgcolor=#E9E9E9
| 251082 ||  || — || September 18, 2006 || Kitt Peak || Spacewatch || — || align=right | 2.5 km || 
|-id=083 bgcolor=#E9E9E9
| 251083 ||  || — || September 19, 2006 || Kitt Peak || Spacewatch || — || align=right | 1.1 km || 
|-id=084 bgcolor=#E9E9E9
| 251084 ||  || — || September 19, 2006 || Kitt Peak || Spacewatch || MIS || align=right | 2.6 km || 
|-id=085 bgcolor=#E9E9E9
| 251085 ||  || — || September 19, 2006 || Kitt Peak || Spacewatch || — || align=right | 1.7 km || 
|-id=086 bgcolor=#E9E9E9
| 251086 ||  || — || September 23, 2006 || Kitt Peak || Spacewatch || RAF || align=right | 1.2 km || 
|-id=087 bgcolor=#E9E9E9
| 251087 ||  || — || September 19, 2006 || Anderson Mesa || LONEOS || — || align=right | 1.3 km || 
|-id=088 bgcolor=#d6d6d6
| 251088 ||  || — || September 21, 2006 || Anderson Mesa || LONEOS || EOS || align=right | 2.7 km || 
|-id=089 bgcolor=#fefefe
| 251089 ||  || — || September 22, 2006 || Socorro || LINEAR || — || align=right | 2.4 km || 
|-id=090 bgcolor=#E9E9E9
| 251090 ||  || — || September 19, 2006 || Kitt Peak || Spacewatch || — || align=right | 1.8 km || 
|-id=091 bgcolor=#E9E9E9
| 251091 ||  || — || September 25, 2006 || Kitt Peak || Spacewatch || — || align=right | 1.1 km || 
|-id=092 bgcolor=#E9E9E9
| 251092 ||  || — || September 27, 2006 || La Sagra || OAM Obs. || — || align=right | 3.0 km || 
|-id=093 bgcolor=#E9E9E9
| 251093 ||  || — || September 24, 2006 || Kitt Peak || Spacewatch || — || align=right | 3.3 km || 
|-id=094 bgcolor=#E9E9E9
| 251094 ||  || — || September 24, 2006 || Kitt Peak || Spacewatch || — || align=right | 1.9 km || 
|-id=095 bgcolor=#E9E9E9
| 251095 ||  || — || September 26, 2006 || Catalina || CSS || — || align=right | 1.8 km || 
|-id=096 bgcolor=#E9E9E9
| 251096 ||  || — || September 25, 2006 || Kitt Peak || Spacewatch || — || align=right | 2.1 km || 
|-id=097 bgcolor=#E9E9E9
| 251097 ||  || — || September 25, 2006 || Mount Lemmon || Mount Lemmon Survey || — || align=right | 1.1 km || 
|-id=098 bgcolor=#E9E9E9
| 251098 ||  || — || September 26, 2006 || Kitt Peak || Spacewatch || — || align=right | 2.5 km || 
|-id=099 bgcolor=#E9E9E9
| 251099 ||  || — || September 26, 2006 || Kitt Peak || Spacewatch || — || align=right | 2.8 km || 
|-id=100 bgcolor=#E9E9E9
| 251100 ||  || — || September 26, 2006 || Mount Lemmon || Mount Lemmon Survey || GER || align=right | 2.0 km || 
|}

251101–251200 

|-bgcolor=#E9E9E9
| 251101 ||  || — || September 29, 2006 || Anderson Mesa || LONEOS || WIT || align=right | 1.5 km || 
|-id=102 bgcolor=#E9E9E9
| 251102 ||  || — || September 29, 2006 || Anderson Mesa || LONEOS || — || align=right | 2.2 km || 
|-id=103 bgcolor=#E9E9E9
| 251103 ||  || — || September 25, 2006 || Socorro || LINEAR || RAF || align=right | 1.4 km || 
|-id=104 bgcolor=#E9E9E9
| 251104 ||  || — || September 26, 2006 || Socorro || LINEAR || — || align=right | 3.0 km || 
|-id=105 bgcolor=#E9E9E9
| 251105 ||  || — || September 27, 2006 || Catalina || CSS || — || align=right | 2.0 km || 
|-id=106 bgcolor=#E9E9E9
| 251106 ||  || — || September 25, 2006 || Kitt Peak || Spacewatch || — || align=right | 1.1 km || 
|-id=107 bgcolor=#E9E9E9
| 251107 ||  || — || September 25, 2006 || Kitt Peak || Spacewatch || — || align=right | 1.2 km || 
|-id=108 bgcolor=#E9E9E9
| 251108 ||  || — || September 25, 2006 || Kitt Peak || Spacewatch || — || align=right | 1.6 km || 
|-id=109 bgcolor=#E9E9E9
| 251109 ||  || — || September 25, 2006 || Kitt Peak || Spacewatch || — || align=right data-sort-value="0.98" | 980 m || 
|-id=110 bgcolor=#E9E9E9
| 251110 ||  || — || September 25, 2006 || Mount Lemmon || Mount Lemmon Survey || — || align=right | 1.0 km || 
|-id=111 bgcolor=#E9E9E9
| 251111 ||  || — || September 27, 2006 || Kitt Peak || Spacewatch || — || align=right | 2.6 km || 
|-id=112 bgcolor=#E9E9E9
| 251112 ||  || — || September 27, 2006 || Kitt Peak || Spacewatch || — || align=right | 2.0 km || 
|-id=113 bgcolor=#E9E9E9
| 251113 ||  || — || September 28, 2006 || Mount Lemmon || Mount Lemmon Survey || — || align=right | 1.8 km || 
|-id=114 bgcolor=#E9E9E9
| 251114 ||  || — || September 28, 2006 || Mount Lemmon || Mount Lemmon Survey || — || align=right | 1.3 km || 
|-id=115 bgcolor=#E9E9E9
| 251115 ||  || — || September 28, 2006 || Kitt Peak || Spacewatch || — || align=right data-sort-value="0.94" | 940 m || 
|-id=116 bgcolor=#E9E9E9
| 251116 ||  || — || September 28, 2006 || Kitt Peak || Spacewatch || — || align=right | 2.2 km || 
|-id=117 bgcolor=#E9E9E9
| 251117 ||  || — || September 30, 2006 || Catalina || CSS || — || align=right | 1.2 km || 
|-id=118 bgcolor=#E9E9E9
| 251118 ||  || — || September 30, 2006 || Catalina || CSS || MAR || align=right | 1.4 km || 
|-id=119 bgcolor=#E9E9E9
| 251119 ||  || — || September 30, 2006 || Catalina || CSS || — || align=right | 5.1 km || 
|-id=120 bgcolor=#E9E9E9
| 251120 ||  || — || September 30, 2006 || Catalina || CSS || — || align=right | 1.8 km || 
|-id=121 bgcolor=#E9E9E9
| 251121 ||  || — || September 30, 2006 || Catalina || CSS || — || align=right | 2.9 km || 
|-id=122 bgcolor=#E9E9E9
| 251122 ||  || — || September 30, 2006 || Kitt Peak || Spacewatch || — || align=right | 2.1 km || 
|-id=123 bgcolor=#E9E9E9
| 251123 ||  || — || September 30, 2006 || Catalina || CSS || — || align=right | 2.0 km || 
|-id=124 bgcolor=#E9E9E9
| 251124 ||  || — || September 28, 2006 || Mount Lemmon || Mount Lemmon Survey || PAD || align=right | 3.0 km || 
|-id=125 bgcolor=#E9E9E9
| 251125 ||  || — || September 17, 2006 || Apache Point || A. C. Becker || ADE || align=right | 3.8 km || 
|-id=126 bgcolor=#E9E9E9
| 251126 ||  || — || September 28, 2006 || Catalina || CSS || — || align=right | 2.6 km || 
|-id=127 bgcolor=#E9E9E9
| 251127 ||  || — || September 27, 2006 || Mount Lemmon || Mount Lemmon Survey || — || align=right | 2.1 km || 
|-id=128 bgcolor=#E9E9E9
| 251128 ||  || — || September 19, 2006 || Kitt Peak || Spacewatch || — || align=right | 2.2 km || 
|-id=129 bgcolor=#E9E9E9
| 251129 ||  || — || September 25, 2006 || Catalina || CSS || — || align=right | 3.1 km || 
|-id=130 bgcolor=#E9E9E9
| 251130 || 2006 TQ || — || October 1, 2006 || Lulin Observatory || C.-S. Lin, Q.-z. Ye || — || align=right | 2.8 km || 
|-id=131 bgcolor=#E9E9E9
| 251131 ||  || — || October 2, 2006 || Mount Lemmon || Mount Lemmon Survey || — || align=right | 1.1 km || 
|-id=132 bgcolor=#E9E9E9
| 251132 ||  || — || October 11, 2006 || Kitt Peak || Spacewatch || — || align=right | 1.8 km || 
|-id=133 bgcolor=#E9E9E9
| 251133 ||  || — || October 11, 2006 || Kitt Peak || Spacewatch || — || align=right | 2.9 km || 
|-id=134 bgcolor=#E9E9E9
| 251134 ||  || — || October 11, 2006 || Kitt Peak || Spacewatch || — || align=right | 1.4 km || 
|-id=135 bgcolor=#E9E9E9
| 251135 ||  || — || October 12, 2006 || Kitt Peak || Spacewatch || — || align=right | 2.5 km || 
|-id=136 bgcolor=#E9E9E9
| 251136 ||  || — || October 12, 2006 || Kitt Peak || Spacewatch || — || align=right | 2.0 km || 
|-id=137 bgcolor=#E9E9E9
| 251137 ||  || — || October 12, 2006 || Kitt Peak || Spacewatch || NEM || align=right | 3.9 km || 
|-id=138 bgcolor=#E9E9E9
| 251138 ||  || — || October 12, 2006 || Kitt Peak || Spacewatch || — || align=right | 2.8 km || 
|-id=139 bgcolor=#E9E9E9
| 251139 ||  || — || October 12, 2006 || Kitt Peak || Spacewatch || HEN || align=right | 1.3 km || 
|-id=140 bgcolor=#E9E9E9
| 251140 ||  || — || October 12, 2006 || Kitt Peak || Spacewatch || — || align=right | 2.3 km || 
|-id=141 bgcolor=#E9E9E9
| 251141 ||  || — || October 12, 2006 || Kitt Peak || Spacewatch || MIS || align=right | 2.5 km || 
|-id=142 bgcolor=#E9E9E9
| 251142 ||  || — || October 12, 2006 || Kitt Peak || Spacewatch || — || align=right | 3.5 km || 
|-id=143 bgcolor=#E9E9E9
| 251143 ||  || — || October 12, 2006 || Kitt Peak || Spacewatch || PAD || align=right | 3.0 km || 
|-id=144 bgcolor=#E9E9E9
| 251144 ||  || — || October 12, 2006 || Kitt Peak || Spacewatch || — || align=right | 2.0 km || 
|-id=145 bgcolor=#E9E9E9
| 251145 ||  || — || October 12, 2006 || Kitt Peak || Spacewatch || PAD || align=right | 2.6 km || 
|-id=146 bgcolor=#E9E9E9
| 251146 ||  || — || October 12, 2006 || Palomar || NEAT || — || align=right | 1.9 km || 
|-id=147 bgcolor=#E9E9E9
| 251147 ||  || — || October 12, 2006 || Kitt Peak || Spacewatch || WIT || align=right | 1.6 km || 
|-id=148 bgcolor=#E9E9E9
| 251148 ||  || — || October 13, 2006 || Kitt Peak || Spacewatch || — || align=right | 2.2 km || 
|-id=149 bgcolor=#E9E9E9
| 251149 ||  || — || October 14, 2006 || Charleston || ARO || — || align=right | 2.0 km || 
|-id=150 bgcolor=#E9E9E9
| 251150 ||  || — || October 11, 2006 || Kitt Peak || Spacewatch || — || align=right | 2.0 km || 
|-id=151 bgcolor=#E9E9E9
| 251151 ||  || — || October 11, 2006 || Palomar || NEAT || — || align=right | 2.0 km || 
|-id=152 bgcolor=#E9E9E9
| 251152 ||  || — || October 11, 2006 || Palomar || NEAT || — || align=right | 2.0 km || 
|-id=153 bgcolor=#E9E9E9
| 251153 ||  || — || October 11, 2006 || Kitt Peak || Spacewatch || — || align=right | 1.7 km || 
|-id=154 bgcolor=#E9E9E9
| 251154 ||  || — || October 11, 2006 || Palomar || NEAT || — || align=right | 1.5 km || 
|-id=155 bgcolor=#E9E9E9
| 251155 ||  || — || October 11, 2006 || Palomar || NEAT || — || align=right | 2.3 km || 
|-id=156 bgcolor=#E9E9E9
| 251156 ||  || — || October 11, 2006 || Palomar || NEAT || — || align=right | 1.7 km || 
|-id=157 bgcolor=#E9E9E9
| 251157 ||  || — || October 11, 2006 || Palomar || NEAT || — || align=right | 1.1 km || 
|-id=158 bgcolor=#E9E9E9
| 251158 ||  || — || October 12, 2006 || Palomar || NEAT || — || align=right | 1.8 km || 
|-id=159 bgcolor=#E9E9E9
| 251159 ||  || — || October 13, 2006 || Kitt Peak || Spacewatch || EUN || align=right | 2.9 km || 
|-id=160 bgcolor=#E9E9E9
| 251160 ||  || — || October 13, 2006 || Kitt Peak || Spacewatch || — || align=right | 3.4 km || 
|-id=161 bgcolor=#E9E9E9
| 251161 ||  || — || October 13, 2006 || Kitt Peak || Spacewatch || WIT || align=right | 1.3 km || 
|-id=162 bgcolor=#E9E9E9
| 251162 ||  || — || October 13, 2006 || Kitt Peak || Spacewatch || — || align=right | 2.3 km || 
|-id=163 bgcolor=#E9E9E9
| 251163 ||  || — || October 13, 2006 || Kitt Peak || Spacewatch || HOF || align=right | 3.3 km || 
|-id=164 bgcolor=#E9E9E9
| 251164 ||  || — || October 13, 2006 || Kitt Peak || Spacewatch || HOF || align=right | 3.1 km || 
|-id=165 bgcolor=#E9E9E9
| 251165 ||  || — || October 14, 2006 || Lulin || C.-S. Lin, Q.-z. Ye || JUN || align=right | 1.7 km || 
|-id=166 bgcolor=#E9E9E9
| 251166 ||  || — || October 2, 2006 || Mount Lemmon || Mount Lemmon Survey || MIS || align=right | 3.6 km || 
|-id=167 bgcolor=#E9E9E9
| 251167 ||  || — || October 1, 2006 || Apache Point || A. C. Becker || — || align=right | 2.1 km || 
|-id=168 bgcolor=#E9E9E9
| 251168 ||  || — || October 13, 2006 || Kitt Peak || Spacewatch || DOR || align=right | 3.2 km || 
|-id=169 bgcolor=#E9E9E9
| 251169 ||  || — || October 16, 2006 || Bergisch Gladbach || W. Bickel || — || align=right | 2.5 km || 
|-id=170 bgcolor=#E9E9E9
| 251170 ||  || — || October 16, 2006 || Goodricke-Pigott || R. A. Tucker || — || align=right | 2.5 km || 
|-id=171 bgcolor=#E9E9E9
| 251171 ||  || — || October 16, 2006 || Catalina || CSS || — || align=right | 2.0 km || 
|-id=172 bgcolor=#E9E9E9
| 251172 ||  || — || October 16, 2006 || Catalina || CSS || ADE || align=right | 3.4 km || 
|-id=173 bgcolor=#E9E9E9
| 251173 ||  || — || October 17, 2006 || Mount Lemmon || Mount Lemmon Survey || — || align=right | 2.1 km || 
|-id=174 bgcolor=#E9E9E9
| 251174 ||  || — || October 17, 2006 || Mount Lemmon || Mount Lemmon Survey || — || align=right | 2.0 km || 
|-id=175 bgcolor=#E9E9E9
| 251175 ||  || — || October 17, 2006 || Mount Lemmon || Mount Lemmon Survey || — || align=right | 2.0 km || 
|-id=176 bgcolor=#E9E9E9
| 251176 ||  || — || October 16, 2006 || Kitt Peak || Spacewatch || — || align=right | 1.6 km || 
|-id=177 bgcolor=#E9E9E9
| 251177 ||  || — || October 16, 2006 || Kitt Peak || Spacewatch || NEM || align=right | 2.7 km || 
|-id=178 bgcolor=#E9E9E9
| 251178 ||  || — || October 16, 2006 || Kitt Peak || Spacewatch || — || align=right | 2.6 km || 
|-id=179 bgcolor=#E9E9E9
| 251179 ||  || — || October 16, 2006 || Kitt Peak || Spacewatch || MIS || align=right | 2.5 km || 
|-id=180 bgcolor=#E9E9E9
| 251180 ||  || — || October 16, 2006 || Kitt Peak || Spacewatch || — || align=right | 1.9 km || 
|-id=181 bgcolor=#E9E9E9
| 251181 ||  || — || October 19, 2006 || Catalina || CSS || JUN || align=right | 1.3 km || 
|-id=182 bgcolor=#E9E9E9
| 251182 ||  || — || October 19, 2006 || Socorro || LINEAR || — || align=right | 2.2 km || 
|-id=183 bgcolor=#E9E9E9
| 251183 ||  || — || October 19, 2006 || Catalina || CSS || EUN || align=right | 3.3 km || 
|-id=184 bgcolor=#E9E9E9
| 251184 ||  || — || October 16, 2006 || Catalina || CSS || — || align=right | 3.6 km || 
|-id=185 bgcolor=#E9E9E9
| 251185 ||  || — || October 17, 2006 || Kitt Peak || Spacewatch || — || align=right | 2.8 km || 
|-id=186 bgcolor=#E9E9E9
| 251186 ||  || — || October 17, 2006 || Kitt Peak || Spacewatch || NEM || align=right | 3.3 km || 
|-id=187 bgcolor=#E9E9E9
| 251187 ||  || — || October 17, 2006 || Mount Lemmon || Mount Lemmon Survey || — || align=right | 2.2 km || 
|-id=188 bgcolor=#E9E9E9
| 251188 ||  || — || October 17, 2006 || Mount Lemmon || Mount Lemmon Survey || — || align=right | 2.4 km || 
|-id=189 bgcolor=#E9E9E9
| 251189 ||  || — || October 17, 2006 || Kitt Peak || Spacewatch || ADE || align=right | 2.8 km || 
|-id=190 bgcolor=#E9E9E9
| 251190 ||  || — || October 17, 2006 || Kitt Peak || Spacewatch || — || align=right | 3.1 km || 
|-id=191 bgcolor=#E9E9E9
| 251191 ||  || — || October 17, 2006 || Kitt Peak || Spacewatch || AGN || align=right | 1.5 km || 
|-id=192 bgcolor=#E9E9E9
| 251192 ||  || — || October 18, 2006 || Kitt Peak || Spacewatch || — || align=right | 1.5 km || 
|-id=193 bgcolor=#E9E9E9
| 251193 ||  || — || October 18, 2006 || Kitt Peak || Spacewatch || — || align=right | 1.6 km || 
|-id=194 bgcolor=#E9E9E9
| 251194 ||  || — || October 19, 2006 || Kitt Peak || Spacewatch || — || align=right | 2.8 km || 
|-id=195 bgcolor=#E9E9E9
| 251195 ||  || — || October 19, 2006 || Kitt Peak || Spacewatch || — || align=right | 1.2 km || 
|-id=196 bgcolor=#E9E9E9
| 251196 ||  || — || October 19, 2006 || Kitt Peak || Spacewatch || — || align=right | 1.5 km || 
|-id=197 bgcolor=#E9E9E9
| 251197 ||  || — || October 19, 2006 || Kitt Peak || Spacewatch || JUN || align=right | 1.6 km || 
|-id=198 bgcolor=#E9E9E9
| 251198 ||  || — || October 19, 2006 || Kitt Peak || Spacewatch || — || align=right | 2.0 km || 
|-id=199 bgcolor=#E9E9E9
| 251199 ||  || — || October 19, 2006 || Kitt Peak || Spacewatch || — || align=right | 2.9 km || 
|-id=200 bgcolor=#E9E9E9
| 251200 ||  || — || October 19, 2006 || Kitt Peak || Spacewatch || — || align=right | 4.2 km || 
|}

251201–251300 

|-bgcolor=#E9E9E9
| 251201 ||  || — || October 20, 2006 || Catalina || CSS || — || align=right | 1.9 km || 
|-id=202 bgcolor=#E9E9E9
| 251202 ||  || — || October 21, 2006 || Kitt Peak || Spacewatch || — || align=right | 2.1 km || 
|-id=203 bgcolor=#E9E9E9
| 251203 ||  || — || October 21, 2006 || Mount Lemmon || Mount Lemmon Survey || — || align=right | 1.7 km || 
|-id=204 bgcolor=#E9E9E9
| 251204 ||  || — || October 21, 2006 || Mount Lemmon || Mount Lemmon Survey || — || align=right | 2.2 km || 
|-id=205 bgcolor=#E9E9E9
| 251205 ||  || — || October 21, 2006 || Mount Lemmon || Mount Lemmon Survey || — || align=right | 3.2 km || 
|-id=206 bgcolor=#E9E9E9
| 251206 ||  || — || October 22, 2006 || Catalina || CSS || — || align=right | 3.3 km || 
|-id=207 bgcolor=#E9E9E9
| 251207 ||  || — || October 16, 2006 || Catalina || CSS || — || align=right | 2.0 km || 
|-id=208 bgcolor=#E9E9E9
| 251208 ||  || — || October 16, 2006 || Catalina || CSS || — || align=right | 1.8 km || 
|-id=209 bgcolor=#E9E9E9
| 251209 ||  || — || October 17, 2006 || Catalina || CSS || EUN || align=right | 2.7 km || 
|-id=210 bgcolor=#E9E9E9
| 251210 ||  || — || October 19, 2006 || Catalina || CSS || — || align=right | 2.6 km || 
|-id=211 bgcolor=#E9E9E9
| 251211 ||  || — || October 24, 2006 || Kitami || K. Endate || — || align=right | 2.6 km || 
|-id=212 bgcolor=#E9E9E9
| 251212 ||  || — || October 23, 2006 || Catalina || CSS || MIT || align=right | 3.6 km || 
|-id=213 bgcolor=#E9E9E9
| 251213 ||  || — || October 19, 2006 || Catalina || CSS || EUN || align=right | 1.7 km || 
|-id=214 bgcolor=#E9E9E9
| 251214 ||  || — || October 19, 2006 || Catalina || CSS || EUN || align=right | 1.4 km || 
|-id=215 bgcolor=#E9E9E9
| 251215 ||  || — || October 19, 2006 || Catalina || CSS || — || align=right | 3.6 km || 
|-id=216 bgcolor=#E9E9E9
| 251216 ||  || — || October 19, 2006 || Catalina || CSS || JNS || align=right | 4.5 km || 
|-id=217 bgcolor=#E9E9E9
| 251217 ||  || — || October 19, 2006 || Catalina || CSS || — || align=right | 2.2 km || 
|-id=218 bgcolor=#E9E9E9
| 251218 ||  || — || October 22, 2006 || Palomar || NEAT || — || align=right | 2.3 km || 
|-id=219 bgcolor=#E9E9E9
| 251219 ||  || — || October 22, 2006 || Palomar || NEAT || EUN || align=right | 1.9 km || 
|-id=220 bgcolor=#E9E9E9
| 251220 ||  || — || October 22, 2006 || Palomar || NEAT || — || align=right | 1.6 km || 
|-id=221 bgcolor=#d6d6d6
| 251221 ||  || — || October 22, 2006 || Kitt Peak || Spacewatch || — || align=right | 6.0 km || 
|-id=222 bgcolor=#E9E9E9
| 251222 ||  || — || October 23, 2006 || Kitt Peak || Spacewatch || — || align=right | 2.0 km || 
|-id=223 bgcolor=#fefefe
| 251223 ||  || — || October 23, 2006 || Kitt Peak || Spacewatch || FLO || align=right data-sort-value="0.74" | 740 m || 
|-id=224 bgcolor=#E9E9E9
| 251224 ||  || — || October 27, 2006 || Nyukasa || Mount Nyukasa Stn. || — || align=right | 1.4 km || 
|-id=225 bgcolor=#E9E9E9
| 251225 ||  || — || October 16, 2006 || Catalina || CSS || JUN || align=right | 2.0 km || 
|-id=226 bgcolor=#E9E9E9
| 251226 ||  || — || October 20, 2006 || Palomar || NEAT || EUN || align=right | 3.0 km || 
|-id=227 bgcolor=#E9E9E9
| 251227 ||  || — || October 22, 2006 || Mount Lemmon || Mount Lemmon Survey || — || align=right | 4.2 km || 
|-id=228 bgcolor=#E9E9E9
| 251228 ||  || — || October 23, 2006 || Catalina || CSS || — || align=right | 2.0 km || 
|-id=229 bgcolor=#E9E9E9
| 251229 ||  || — || October 27, 2006 || Mount Lemmon || Mount Lemmon Survey || — || align=right | 1.7 km || 
|-id=230 bgcolor=#d6d6d6
| 251230 ||  || — || October 27, 2006 || Mount Lemmon || Mount Lemmon Survey || — || align=right | 2.7 km || 
|-id=231 bgcolor=#E9E9E9
| 251231 ||  || — || October 27, 2006 || Kitt Peak || Spacewatch || — || align=right | 3.6 km || 
|-id=232 bgcolor=#E9E9E9
| 251232 ||  || — || October 27, 2006 || Mount Lemmon || Mount Lemmon Survey || — || align=right | 2.0 km || 
|-id=233 bgcolor=#E9E9E9
| 251233 ||  || — || October 27, 2006 || Kitt Peak || Spacewatch || PAD || align=right | 2.9 km || 
|-id=234 bgcolor=#E9E9E9
| 251234 ||  || — || October 28, 2006 || Kitt Peak || Spacewatch || — || align=right | 1.7 km || 
|-id=235 bgcolor=#E9E9E9
| 251235 ||  || — || October 28, 2006 || Mount Lemmon || Mount Lemmon Survey || — || align=right | 1.8 km || 
|-id=236 bgcolor=#E9E9E9
| 251236 ||  || — || October 28, 2006 || Kitt Peak || Spacewatch || — || align=right | 2.6 km || 
|-id=237 bgcolor=#E9E9E9
| 251237 ||  || — || October 28, 2006 || Kitt Peak || Spacewatch || — || align=right | 2.7 km || 
|-id=238 bgcolor=#E9E9E9
| 251238 ||  || — || October 28, 2006 || Kitt Peak || Spacewatch || — || align=right | 2.9 km || 
|-id=239 bgcolor=#E9E9E9
| 251239 ||  || — || October 31, 2006 || Kitt Peak || Spacewatch || — || align=right | 2.5 km || 
|-id=240 bgcolor=#E9E9E9
| 251240 ||  || — || October 27, 2006 || Catalina || CSS || WIT || align=right | 1.3 km || 
|-id=241 bgcolor=#E9E9E9
| 251241 ||  || — || October 27, 2006 || Catalina || CSS || DOR || align=right | 3.6 km || 
|-id=242 bgcolor=#E9E9E9
| 251242 ||  || — || October 20, 2006 || Mount Lemmon || Mount Lemmon Survey || — || align=right | 2.8 km || 
|-id=243 bgcolor=#E9E9E9
| 251243 ||  || — || November 11, 2006 || Kitt Peak || Spacewatch || — || align=right | 2.8 km || 
|-id=244 bgcolor=#E9E9E9
| 251244 ||  || — || November 11, 2006 || Catalina || CSS || — || align=right | 1.7 km || 
|-id=245 bgcolor=#E9E9E9
| 251245 ||  || — || November 9, 2006 || Kitt Peak || Spacewatch || — || align=right | 2.8 km || 
|-id=246 bgcolor=#E9E9E9
| 251246 ||  || — || November 10, 2006 || Kitt Peak || Spacewatch || — || align=right | 1.9 km || 
|-id=247 bgcolor=#d6d6d6
| 251247 ||  || — || November 10, 2006 || Kitt Peak || Spacewatch || — || align=right | 4.4 km || 
|-id=248 bgcolor=#E9E9E9
| 251248 ||  || — || November 11, 2006 || Catalina || CSS || MAR || align=right | 1.9 km || 
|-id=249 bgcolor=#E9E9E9
| 251249 ||  || — || November 12, 2006 || Mount Lemmon || Mount Lemmon Survey || — || align=right | 3.8 km || 
|-id=250 bgcolor=#E9E9E9
| 251250 ||  || — || November 13, 2006 || Kitt Peak || Spacewatch || — || align=right | 2.7 km || 
|-id=251 bgcolor=#E9E9E9
| 251251 ||  || — || November 10, 2006 || Kitt Peak || Spacewatch || — || align=right | 2.5 km || 
|-id=252 bgcolor=#E9E9E9
| 251252 ||  || — || November 10, 2006 || Kitt Peak || Spacewatch || — || align=right | 2.9 km || 
|-id=253 bgcolor=#E9E9E9
| 251253 ||  || — || November 11, 2006 || Kitt Peak || Spacewatch || — || align=right | 2.6 km || 
|-id=254 bgcolor=#E9E9E9
| 251254 ||  || — || November 14, 2006 || Socorro || LINEAR || MRX || align=right | 1.5 km || 
|-id=255 bgcolor=#E9E9E9
| 251255 ||  || — || November 14, 2006 || Kitt Peak || Spacewatch || — || align=right | 1.7 km || 
|-id=256 bgcolor=#E9E9E9
| 251256 ||  || — || November 14, 2006 || Catalina || CSS || — || align=right | 1.8 km || 
|-id=257 bgcolor=#E9E9E9
| 251257 ||  || — || November 11, 2006 || Catalina || CSS || EUN || align=right | 1.9 km || 
|-id=258 bgcolor=#E9E9E9
| 251258 ||  || — || November 13, 2006 || Kitt Peak || Spacewatch || WIT || align=right | 1.5 km || 
|-id=259 bgcolor=#E9E9E9
| 251259 ||  || — || November 13, 2006 || Catalina || CSS || KON || align=right | 3.4 km || 
|-id=260 bgcolor=#E9E9E9
| 251260 ||  || — || November 13, 2006 || Kitt Peak || Spacewatch || — || align=right | 2.2 km || 
|-id=261 bgcolor=#d6d6d6
| 251261 ||  || — || November 14, 2006 || Kitt Peak || Spacewatch || KOR || align=right | 1.5 km || 
|-id=262 bgcolor=#E9E9E9
| 251262 ||  || — || November 15, 2006 || Kitt Peak || Spacewatch || — || align=right | 2.4 km || 
|-id=263 bgcolor=#E9E9E9
| 251263 ||  || — || November 2, 2006 || Mount Lemmon || Mount Lemmon Survey || — || align=right | 2.0 km || 
|-id=264 bgcolor=#E9E9E9
| 251264 ||  || — || November 16, 2006 || Nyukasa || Mount Nyukasa Stn. || — || align=right | 3.5 km || 
|-id=265 bgcolor=#d6d6d6
| 251265 ||  || — || November 17, 2006 || Pla D'Arguines || R. Ferrando || DUR || align=right | 5.2 km || 
|-id=266 bgcolor=#E9E9E9
| 251266 ||  || — || November 16, 2006 || Mount Lemmon || Mount Lemmon Survey || — || align=right | 2.3 km || 
|-id=267 bgcolor=#E9E9E9
| 251267 ||  || — || November 16, 2006 || Catalina || CSS || ADE || align=right | 3.6 km || 
|-id=268 bgcolor=#E9E9E9
| 251268 ||  || — || November 16, 2006 || Lulin Observatory || M.-T. Chang, Q.-z. Ye || — || align=right | 3.2 km || 
|-id=269 bgcolor=#E9E9E9
| 251269 ||  || — || November 18, 2006 || Socorro || LINEAR || — || align=right | 2.5 km || 
|-id=270 bgcolor=#E9E9E9
| 251270 ||  || — || November 16, 2006 || Kitt Peak || Spacewatch || AGN || align=right | 1.4 km || 
|-id=271 bgcolor=#E9E9E9
| 251271 ||  || — || November 16, 2006 || Catalina || CSS || — || align=right | 2.5 km || 
|-id=272 bgcolor=#d6d6d6
| 251272 ||  || — || November 16, 2006 || Kitt Peak || Spacewatch || KOR || align=right | 1.7 km || 
|-id=273 bgcolor=#E9E9E9
| 251273 ||  || — || November 16, 2006 || Kitt Peak || Spacewatch || — || align=right | 1.8 km || 
|-id=274 bgcolor=#E9E9E9
| 251274 ||  || — || November 16, 2006 || Kitt Peak || Spacewatch || EUN || align=right | 2.0 km || 
|-id=275 bgcolor=#E9E9E9
| 251275 ||  || — || November 16, 2006 || Catalina || CSS || EUN || align=right | 2.2 km || 
|-id=276 bgcolor=#E9E9E9
| 251276 ||  || — || November 17, 2006 || Kitt Peak || Spacewatch || — || align=right | 3.6 km || 
|-id=277 bgcolor=#E9E9E9
| 251277 ||  || — || November 17, 2006 || Catalina || CSS || MRX || align=right | 1.2 km || 
|-id=278 bgcolor=#E9E9E9
| 251278 ||  || — || November 17, 2006 || Catalina || CSS || — || align=right | 3.3 km || 
|-id=279 bgcolor=#d6d6d6
| 251279 ||  || — || November 17, 2006 || Catalina || CSS || — || align=right | 4.5 km || 
|-id=280 bgcolor=#d6d6d6
| 251280 ||  || — || November 17, 2006 || Mount Lemmon || Mount Lemmon Survey || CHA || align=right | 2.5 km || 
|-id=281 bgcolor=#E9E9E9
| 251281 ||  || — || November 17, 2006 || Mount Lemmon || Mount Lemmon Survey || — || align=right | 2.0 km || 
|-id=282 bgcolor=#E9E9E9
| 251282 ||  || — || November 18, 2006 || Kitt Peak || Spacewatch || HOF || align=right | 2.4 km || 
|-id=283 bgcolor=#E9E9E9
| 251283 ||  || — || November 18, 2006 || Mount Lemmon || Mount Lemmon Survey || — || align=right | 2.1 km || 
|-id=284 bgcolor=#E9E9E9
| 251284 ||  || — || November 19, 2006 || Kitt Peak || Spacewatch || — || align=right | 2.0 km || 
|-id=285 bgcolor=#E9E9E9
| 251285 ||  || — || November 19, 2006 || Catalina || CSS || PAD || align=right | 2.3 km || 
|-id=286 bgcolor=#E9E9E9
| 251286 ||  || — || November 19, 2006 || Socorro || LINEAR || — || align=right | 1.7 km || 
|-id=287 bgcolor=#E9E9E9
| 251287 ||  || — || November 20, 2006 || Mount Lemmon || Mount Lemmon Survey || WIT || align=right | 1.3 km || 
|-id=288 bgcolor=#E9E9E9
| 251288 ||  || — || November 21, 2006 || Socorro || LINEAR || — || align=right | 2.3 km || 
|-id=289 bgcolor=#E9E9E9
| 251289 ||  || — || November 22, 2006 || Socorro || LINEAR || NEM || align=right | 3.0 km || 
|-id=290 bgcolor=#E9E9E9
| 251290 ||  || — || November 20, 2006 || Socorro || LINEAR || — || align=right | 2.8 km || 
|-id=291 bgcolor=#E9E9E9
| 251291 ||  || — || November 22, 2006 || Kitt Peak || Spacewatch || — || align=right | 1.7 km || 
|-id=292 bgcolor=#E9E9E9
| 251292 ||  || — || November 23, 2006 || Kitt Peak || Spacewatch || — || align=right | 2.9 km || 
|-id=293 bgcolor=#E9E9E9
| 251293 ||  || — || November 24, 2006 || Kitt Peak || Spacewatch || WIT || align=right | 1.4 km || 
|-id=294 bgcolor=#E9E9E9
| 251294 ||  || — || November 27, 2006 || Kitt Peak || Spacewatch || — || align=right | 3.2 km || 
|-id=295 bgcolor=#d6d6d6
| 251295 ||  || — || December 9, 2006 || Kitt Peak || Spacewatch || KOR || align=right | 1.6 km || 
|-id=296 bgcolor=#E9E9E9
| 251296 ||  || — || December 9, 2006 || Kitt Peak || Spacewatch || — || align=right | 2.4 km || 
|-id=297 bgcolor=#d6d6d6
| 251297 ||  || — || December 12, 2006 || Kitt Peak || Spacewatch || KOR || align=right | 1.7 km || 
|-id=298 bgcolor=#d6d6d6
| 251298 ||  || — || December 11, 2006 || Kitt Peak || Spacewatch || ARM || align=right | 6.9 km || 
|-id=299 bgcolor=#d6d6d6
| 251299 ||  || — || December 12, 2006 || Mount Lemmon || Mount Lemmon Survey || EMA || align=right | 5.4 km || 
|-id=300 bgcolor=#d6d6d6
| 251300 ||  || — || December 12, 2006 || Catalina || CSS || KAR || align=right | 1.5 km || 
|}

251301–251400 

|-bgcolor=#d6d6d6
| 251301 ||  || — || December 12, 2006 || Mount Lemmon || Mount Lemmon Survey || — || align=right | 3.2 km || 
|-id=302 bgcolor=#E9E9E9
| 251302 ||  || — || December 13, 2006 || Mount Lemmon || Mount Lemmon Survey || JUN || align=right | 1.7 km || 
|-id=303 bgcolor=#E9E9E9
| 251303 ||  || — || December 15, 2006 || Socorro || LINEAR || — || align=right | 2.0 km || 
|-id=304 bgcolor=#E9E9E9
| 251304 ||  || — || December 15, 2006 || Socorro || LINEAR || — || align=right | 2.5 km || 
|-id=305 bgcolor=#E9E9E9
| 251305 ||  || — || December 15, 2006 || Socorro || LINEAR || JUN || align=right | 2.2 km || 
|-id=306 bgcolor=#d6d6d6
| 251306 ||  || — || December 14, 2006 || Kitt Peak || Spacewatch || — || align=right | 4.1 km || 
|-id=307 bgcolor=#d6d6d6
| 251307 ||  || — || December 15, 2006 || Kitt Peak || Spacewatch || — || align=right | 3.6 km || 
|-id=308 bgcolor=#E9E9E9
| 251308 ||  || — || December 12, 2006 || Socorro || LINEAR || — || align=right | 3.7 km || 
|-id=309 bgcolor=#d6d6d6
| 251309 ||  || — || December 18, 2006 || Socorro || LINEAR || — || align=right | 5.6 km || 
|-id=310 bgcolor=#d6d6d6
| 251310 ||  || — || December 21, 2006 || Kitt Peak || Spacewatch || EOS || align=right | 2.7 km || 
|-id=311 bgcolor=#E9E9E9
| 251311 ||  || — || December 22, 2006 || Črni Vrh || Črni Vrh || — || align=right | 4.5 km || 
|-id=312 bgcolor=#E9E9E9
| 251312 ||  || — || December 23, 2006 || Črni Vrh || Črni Vrh || — || align=right | 3.0 km || 
|-id=313 bgcolor=#E9E9E9
| 251313 ||  || — || December 21, 2006 || Kitt Peak || Spacewatch || — || align=right | 2.0 km || 
|-id=314 bgcolor=#E9E9E9
| 251314 ||  || — || December 22, 2006 || Catalina || CSS || — || align=right | 3.2 km || 
|-id=315 bgcolor=#d6d6d6
| 251315 ||  || — || January 15, 2007 || Catalina || CSS || — || align=right | 3.5 km || 
|-id=316 bgcolor=#d6d6d6
| 251316 ||  || — || January 10, 2007 || Mount Lemmon || Mount Lemmon Survey || — || align=right | 5.0 km || 
|-id=317 bgcolor=#d6d6d6
| 251317 ||  || — || January 17, 2007 || Palomar || NEAT || EOS || align=right | 3.2 km || 
|-id=318 bgcolor=#d6d6d6
| 251318 ||  || — || January 17, 2007 || Mount Lemmon || Mount Lemmon Survey || — || align=right | 5.0 km || 
|-id=319 bgcolor=#d6d6d6
| 251319 ||  || — || January 18, 2007 || Palomar || NEAT || KOR || align=right | 1.7 km || 
|-id=320 bgcolor=#d6d6d6
| 251320 ||  || — || January 24, 2007 || Mount Lemmon || Mount Lemmon Survey || — || align=right | 3.9 km || 
|-id=321 bgcolor=#d6d6d6
| 251321 ||  || — || January 24, 2007 || Catalina || CSS || — || align=right | 3.2 km || 
|-id=322 bgcolor=#E9E9E9
| 251322 ||  || — || January 24, 2007 || Socorro || LINEAR || — || align=right | 3.4 km || 
|-id=323 bgcolor=#d6d6d6
| 251323 ||  || — || January 27, 2007 || Mount Lemmon || Mount Lemmon Survey || — || align=right | 5.1 km || 
|-id=324 bgcolor=#d6d6d6
| 251324 ||  || — || February 8, 2007 || Kitt Peak || Spacewatch || — || align=right | 3.1 km || 
|-id=325 bgcolor=#d6d6d6
| 251325 Leopoldjosefine ||  ||  || February 9, 2007 || Gaisberg || R. Gierlinger || — || align=right | 4.8 km || 
|-id=326 bgcolor=#d6d6d6
| 251326 ||  || — || February 7, 2007 || Kitt Peak || Spacewatch || — || align=right | 3.1 km || 
|-id=327 bgcolor=#d6d6d6
| 251327 ||  || — || February 8, 2007 || Palomar || NEAT || — || align=right | 3.3 km || 
|-id=328 bgcolor=#d6d6d6
| 251328 ||  || — || February 10, 2007 || Palomar || NEAT || — || align=right | 3.4 km || 
|-id=329 bgcolor=#d6d6d6
| 251329 ||  || — || February 17, 2007 || Kitt Peak || Spacewatch || HYG || align=right | 3.3 km || 
|-id=330 bgcolor=#d6d6d6
| 251330 ||  || — || February 21, 2007 || Socorro || LINEAR || VER || align=right | 4.4 km || 
|-id=331 bgcolor=#d6d6d6
| 251331 ||  || — || February 25, 2007 || Mount Lemmon || Mount Lemmon Survey || VER || align=right | 4.1 km || 
|-id=332 bgcolor=#d6d6d6
| 251332 ||  || — || February 23, 2007 || Kitt Peak || Spacewatch || — || align=right | 4.2 km || 
|-id=333 bgcolor=#d6d6d6
| 251333 ||  || — || February 17, 2007 || Kitt Peak || Spacewatch || — || align=right | 5.8 km || 
|-id=334 bgcolor=#d6d6d6
| 251334 ||  || — || March 9, 2007 || Kitt Peak || Spacewatch || — || align=right | 4.1 km || 
|-id=335 bgcolor=#d6d6d6
| 251335 ||  || — || March 9, 2007 || Mount Lemmon || Mount Lemmon Survey || EOS || align=right | 4.0 km || 
|-id=336 bgcolor=#d6d6d6
| 251336 ||  || — || March 9, 2007 || Mount Lemmon || Mount Lemmon Survey || — || align=right | 3.6 km || 
|-id=337 bgcolor=#d6d6d6
| 251337 ||  || — || March 10, 2007 || Mount Lemmon || Mount Lemmon Survey || — || align=right | 3.0 km || 
|-id=338 bgcolor=#d6d6d6
| 251338 ||  || — || March 14, 2007 || Kitt Peak || Spacewatch || 3:2 || align=right | 7.2 km || 
|-id=339 bgcolor=#d6d6d6
| 251339 ||  || — || March 9, 2007 || Palomar || NEAT || EOS || align=right | 3.6 km || 
|-id=340 bgcolor=#fefefe
| 251340 ||  || — || April 19, 2007 || Siding Spring || SSS || H || align=right data-sort-value="0.66" | 660 m || 
|-id=341 bgcolor=#fefefe
| 251341 ||  || — || July 23, 2007 || Črni Vrh || Črni Vrh || H || align=right | 1.1 km || 
|-id=342 bgcolor=#fefefe
| 251342 ||  || — || August 4, 2007 || Siding Spring || SSS || — || align=right | 4.1 km || 
|-id=343 bgcolor=#FA8072
| 251343 ||  || — || August 14, 2007 || Socorro || LINEAR || H || align=right | 1.2 km || 
|-id=344 bgcolor=#d6d6d6
| 251344 ||  || — || September 10, 2007 || Kitt Peak || Spacewatch || EUP || align=right | 4.8 km || 
|-id=345 bgcolor=#fefefe
| 251345 ||  || — || September 14, 2007 || Mount Lemmon || Mount Lemmon Survey || — || align=right data-sort-value="0.81" | 810 m || 
|-id=346 bgcolor=#FFC2E0
| 251346 ||  || — || September 17, 2007 || Socorro || LINEAR || APO +1kmPHA || align=right | 1.5 km || 
|-id=347 bgcolor=#fefefe
| 251347 ||  || — || October 6, 2007 || Socorro || LINEAR || — || align=right data-sort-value="0.92" | 920 m || 
|-id=348 bgcolor=#fefefe
| 251348 ||  || — || October 8, 2007 || Kitt Peak || Spacewatch || — || align=right data-sort-value="0.99" | 990 m || 
|-id=349 bgcolor=#fefefe
| 251349 ||  || — || October 6, 2007 || Kitt Peak || Spacewatch || NYS || align=right | 1.6 km || 
|-id=350 bgcolor=#fefefe
| 251350 ||  || — || October 7, 2007 || Kitt Peak || Spacewatch || — || align=right | 1.1 km || 
|-id=351 bgcolor=#fefefe
| 251351 ||  || — || October 4, 2007 || Kitt Peak || Spacewatch || — || align=right | 1.1 km || 
|-id=352 bgcolor=#fefefe
| 251352 ||  || — || October 7, 2007 || Mount Lemmon || Mount Lemmon Survey || — || align=right data-sort-value="0.83" | 830 m || 
|-id=353 bgcolor=#fefefe
| 251353 ||  || — || October 8, 2007 || Catalina || CSS || — || align=right | 1.1 km || 
|-id=354 bgcolor=#fefefe
| 251354 ||  || — || October 7, 2007 || Mount Lemmon || Mount Lemmon Survey || — || align=right data-sort-value="0.98" | 980 m || 
|-id=355 bgcolor=#fefefe
| 251355 ||  || — || October 9, 2007 || Mount Lemmon || Mount Lemmon Survey || NYS || align=right | 1.0 km || 
|-id=356 bgcolor=#fefefe
| 251356 ||  || — || October 11, 2007 || Socorro || LINEAR || — || align=right data-sort-value="0.85" | 850 m || 
|-id=357 bgcolor=#fefefe
| 251357 ||  || — || October 12, 2007 || Socorro || LINEAR || FLO || align=right data-sort-value="0.65" | 650 m || 
|-id=358 bgcolor=#fefefe
| 251358 ||  || — || October 7, 2007 || Catalina || CSS || FLO || align=right | 1.3 km || 
|-id=359 bgcolor=#fefefe
| 251359 ||  || — || October 7, 2007 || Kitt Peak || Spacewatch || V || align=right | 1.0 km || 
|-id=360 bgcolor=#fefefe
| 251360 ||  || — || October 10, 2007 || Kitt Peak || Spacewatch || — || align=right data-sort-value="0.83" | 830 m || 
|-id=361 bgcolor=#fefefe
| 251361 ||  || — || October 10, 2007 || Mount Lemmon || Mount Lemmon Survey || — || align=right data-sort-value="0.83" | 830 m || 
|-id=362 bgcolor=#fefefe
| 251362 ||  || — || October 14, 2007 || Catalina || CSS || — || align=right data-sort-value="0.92" | 920 m || 
|-id=363 bgcolor=#fefefe
| 251363 ||  || — || October 9, 2007 || Kitt Peak || Spacewatch || V || align=right data-sort-value="0.85" | 850 m || 
|-id=364 bgcolor=#fefefe
| 251364 ||  || — || October 10, 2007 || Kitt Peak || Spacewatch || — || align=right data-sort-value="0.96" | 960 m || 
|-id=365 bgcolor=#FA8072
| 251365 ||  || — || October 13, 2007 || Socorro || LINEAR || — || align=right data-sort-value="0.77" | 770 m || 
|-id=366 bgcolor=#fefefe
| 251366 ||  || — || October 9, 2007 || Kitt Peak || Spacewatch || — || align=right | 1.0 km || 
|-id=367 bgcolor=#E9E9E9
| 251367 ||  || — || October 19, 2007 || Catalina || CSS || — || align=right | 2.5 km || 
|-id=368 bgcolor=#fefefe
| 251368 ||  || — || October 16, 2007 || Kitt Peak || Spacewatch || — || align=right | 1.3 km || 
|-id=369 bgcolor=#fefefe
| 251369 ||  || — || October 20, 2007 || Catalina || CSS || — || align=right data-sort-value="0.94" | 940 m || 
|-id=370 bgcolor=#fefefe
| 251370 ||  || — || October 30, 2007 || Kitt Peak || Spacewatch || — || align=right data-sort-value="0.84" | 840 m || 
|-id=371 bgcolor=#fefefe
| 251371 ||  || — || October 30, 2007 || Kitt Peak || Spacewatch || — || align=right data-sort-value="0.85" | 850 m || 
|-id=372 bgcolor=#fefefe
| 251372 ||  || — || October 30, 2007 || Kitt Peak || Spacewatch || — || align=right | 1.1 km || 
|-id=373 bgcolor=#fefefe
| 251373 ||  || — || November 2, 2007 || Catalina || CSS || — || align=right | 1.4 km || 
|-id=374 bgcolor=#fefefe
| 251374 ||  || — || November 1, 2007 || Kitt Peak || Spacewatch || FLO || align=right data-sort-value="0.72" | 720 m || 
|-id=375 bgcolor=#fefefe
| 251375 ||  || — || November 1, 2007 || Kitt Peak || Spacewatch || — || align=right | 1.1 km || 
|-id=376 bgcolor=#fefefe
| 251376 ||  || — || November 1, 2007 || Kitt Peak || Spacewatch || FLO || align=right data-sort-value="0.62" | 620 m || 
|-id=377 bgcolor=#fefefe
| 251377 ||  || — || November 1, 2007 || Kitt Peak || Spacewatch || FLO || align=right data-sort-value="0.71" | 710 m || 
|-id=378 bgcolor=#fefefe
| 251378 ||  || — || November 3, 2007 || Kitt Peak || Spacewatch || MAS || align=right data-sort-value="0.90" | 900 m || 
|-id=379 bgcolor=#fefefe
| 251379 ||  || — || November 3, 2007 || Kitt Peak || Spacewatch || FLO || align=right | 1.9 km || 
|-id=380 bgcolor=#E9E9E9
| 251380 ||  || — || November 3, 2007 || Kitt Peak || Spacewatch || — || align=right | 2.7 km || 
|-id=381 bgcolor=#fefefe
| 251381 ||  || — || November 2, 2007 || Socorro || LINEAR || — || align=right | 1.3 km || 
|-id=382 bgcolor=#fefefe
| 251382 ||  || — || November 4, 2007 || Socorro || LINEAR || FLO || align=right data-sort-value="0.81" | 810 m || 
|-id=383 bgcolor=#fefefe
| 251383 ||  || — || November 7, 2007 || Bisei SG Center || BATTeRS || FLO || align=right data-sort-value="0.68" | 680 m || 
|-id=384 bgcolor=#fefefe
| 251384 ||  || — || November 2, 2007 || Kitt Peak || Spacewatch || — || align=right | 1.2 km || 
|-id=385 bgcolor=#fefefe
| 251385 ||  || — || November 5, 2007 || Kitt Peak || Spacewatch || — || align=right data-sort-value="0.94" | 940 m || 
|-id=386 bgcolor=#fefefe
| 251386 ||  || — || November 5, 2007 || Kitt Peak || Spacewatch || — || align=right data-sort-value="0.87" | 870 m || 
|-id=387 bgcolor=#fefefe
| 251387 ||  || — || November 3, 2007 || Mount Lemmon || Mount Lemmon Survey || FLO || align=right data-sort-value="0.89" | 890 m || 
|-id=388 bgcolor=#fefefe
| 251388 ||  || — || November 12, 2007 || Bisei SG Center || BATTeRS || — || align=right | 1.8 km || 
|-id=389 bgcolor=#E9E9E9
| 251389 ||  || — || November 4, 2007 || Mount Lemmon || Mount Lemmon Survey || NEM || align=right | 2.8 km || 
|-id=390 bgcolor=#fefefe
| 251390 ||  || — || November 8, 2007 || Catalina || CSS || — || align=right | 1.3 km || 
|-id=391 bgcolor=#E9E9E9
| 251391 ||  || — || November 7, 2007 || Kitt Peak || Spacewatch || — || align=right | 1.9 km || 
|-id=392 bgcolor=#fefefe
| 251392 ||  || — || November 15, 2007 || La Sagra || OAM Obs. || — || align=right data-sort-value="0.92" | 920 m || 
|-id=393 bgcolor=#fefefe
| 251393 ||  || — || November 3, 2007 || Mount Lemmon || Mount Lemmon Survey || NYS || align=right data-sort-value="0.69" | 690 m || 
|-id=394 bgcolor=#fefefe
| 251394 ||  || — || November 19, 2007 || Kitt Peak || Spacewatch || — || align=right | 1.4 km || 
|-id=395 bgcolor=#E9E9E9
| 251395 ||  || — || November 19, 2007 || Mount Lemmon || Mount Lemmon Survey || — || align=right | 2.1 km || 
|-id=396 bgcolor=#fefefe
| 251396 ||  || — || November 17, 2007 || Kitt Peak || Spacewatch || — || align=right | 1.1 km || 
|-id=397 bgcolor=#fefefe
| 251397 ||  || — || December 10, 2007 || Socorro || LINEAR || — || align=right | 1.8 km || 
|-id=398 bgcolor=#FA8072
| 251398 ||  || — || December 14, 2007 || La Sagra || OAM Obs. || — || align=right | 1.1 km || 
|-id=399 bgcolor=#E9E9E9
| 251399 ||  || — || December 10, 2007 || Socorro || LINEAR || — || align=right | 4.4 km || 
|-id=400 bgcolor=#fefefe
| 251400 ||  || — || December 4, 2007 || Socorro || LINEAR || NYS || align=right | 2.0 km || 
|}

251401–251500 

|-bgcolor=#fefefe
| 251401 ||  || — || December 16, 2007 || Kitt Peak || Spacewatch || MAS || align=right data-sort-value="0.73" | 730 m || 
|-id=402 bgcolor=#fefefe
| 251402 ||  || — || December 16, 2007 || Kitt Peak || Spacewatch || NYS || align=right data-sort-value="0.95" | 950 m || 
|-id=403 bgcolor=#E9E9E9
| 251403 ||  || — || December 17, 2007 || Mount Lemmon || Mount Lemmon Survey || EUN || align=right | 2.1 km || 
|-id=404 bgcolor=#fefefe
| 251404 ||  || — || December 28, 2007 || Kitt Peak || Spacewatch || NYS || align=right | 1.0 km || 
|-id=405 bgcolor=#fefefe
| 251405 ||  || — || December 28, 2007 || Lulin Observatory || LUSS || NYS || align=right data-sort-value="0.67" | 670 m || 
|-id=406 bgcolor=#E9E9E9
| 251406 ||  || — || December 31, 2007 || Kitt Peak || Spacewatch || — || align=right | 2.2 km || 
|-id=407 bgcolor=#E9E9E9
| 251407 ||  || — || January 8, 2008 || Dauban || F. Kugel || — || align=right | 4.2 km || 
|-id=408 bgcolor=#fefefe
| 251408 ||  || — || January 4, 2008 || Bisei SG Center || BATTeRS || V || align=right data-sort-value="0.90" | 900 m || 
|-id=409 bgcolor=#fefefe
| 251409 ||  || — || January 10, 2008 || Mount Lemmon || Mount Lemmon Survey || — || align=right | 1.2 km || 
|-id=410 bgcolor=#E9E9E9
| 251410 ||  || — || January 10, 2008 || Mount Lemmon || Mount Lemmon Survey || — || align=right | 1.3 km || 
|-id=411 bgcolor=#E9E9E9
| 251411 ||  || — || January 10, 2008 || Mount Lemmon || Mount Lemmon Survey || — || align=right | 2.7 km || 
|-id=412 bgcolor=#E9E9E9
| 251412 ||  || — || January 11, 2008 || Mayhill || A. Lowe || — || align=right | 4.1 km || 
|-id=413 bgcolor=#fefefe
| 251413 ||  || — || January 8, 2008 || Altschwendt || W. Ries || NYS || align=right | 1.1 km || 
|-id=414 bgcolor=#d6d6d6
| 251414 ||  || — || January 10, 2008 || Catalina || CSS || — || align=right | 4.6 km || 
|-id=415 bgcolor=#E9E9E9
| 251415 ||  || — || January 10, 2008 || Kitt Peak || Spacewatch || — || align=right | 1.5 km || 
|-id=416 bgcolor=#E9E9E9
| 251416 ||  || — || January 11, 2008 || Kitt Peak || Spacewatch || — || align=right | 2.6 km || 
|-id=417 bgcolor=#E9E9E9
| 251417 ||  || — || January 11, 2008 || Kitt Peak || Spacewatch || — || align=right | 2.0 km || 
|-id=418 bgcolor=#E9E9E9
| 251418 ||  || — || January 11, 2008 || Kitt Peak || Spacewatch || — || align=right | 3.7 km || 
|-id=419 bgcolor=#fefefe
| 251419 ||  || — || January 11, 2008 || Kitt Peak || Spacewatch || — || align=right data-sort-value="0.96" | 960 m || 
|-id=420 bgcolor=#d6d6d6
| 251420 ||  || — || January 12, 2008 || Kitt Peak || Spacewatch || — || align=right | 3.7 km || 
|-id=421 bgcolor=#E9E9E9
| 251421 ||  || — || January 13, 2008 || Mount Lemmon || Mount Lemmon Survey || JNS || align=right | 3.2 km || 
|-id=422 bgcolor=#E9E9E9
| 251422 ||  || — || January 13, 2008 || Kitt Peak || Spacewatch || — || align=right | 1.2 km || 
|-id=423 bgcolor=#d6d6d6
| 251423 ||  || — || January 14, 2008 || Kitt Peak || Spacewatch || — || align=right | 3.7 km || 
|-id=424 bgcolor=#d6d6d6
| 251424 ||  || — || January 15, 2008 || Kitt Peak || Spacewatch || — || align=right | 4.8 km || 
|-id=425 bgcolor=#d6d6d6
| 251425 ||  || — || January 10, 2008 || Mount Lemmon || Mount Lemmon Survey || — || align=right | 4.3 km || 
|-id=426 bgcolor=#E9E9E9
| 251426 ||  || — || January 13, 2008 || Kitt Peak || Spacewatch || WIT || align=right | 1.1 km || 
|-id=427 bgcolor=#fefefe
| 251427 ||  || — || January 28, 2008 || La Sagra || OAM Obs. || NYS || align=right | 1.1 km || 
|-id=428 bgcolor=#FA8072
| 251428 ||  || — || January 28, 2008 || Lulin || LUSS || — || align=right data-sort-value="0.97" | 970 m || 
|-id=429 bgcolor=#d6d6d6
| 251429 ||  || — || January 30, 2008 || Mount Lemmon || Mount Lemmon Survey || LIX || align=right | 5.4 km || 
|-id=430 bgcolor=#d6d6d6
| 251430 ||  || — || January 30, 2008 || Kitt Peak || Spacewatch || EOS || align=right | 3.3 km || 
|-id=431 bgcolor=#d6d6d6
| 251431 ||  || — || January 30, 2008 || Kitt Peak || Spacewatch || — || align=right | 2.9 km || 
|-id=432 bgcolor=#d6d6d6
| 251432 ||  || — || January 30, 2008 || Mount Lemmon || Mount Lemmon Survey || — || align=right | 3.8 km || 
|-id=433 bgcolor=#E9E9E9
| 251433 ||  || — || January 30, 2008 || Kitt Peak || Spacewatch || PAD || align=right | 3.2 km || 
|-id=434 bgcolor=#E9E9E9
| 251434 ||  || — || January 18, 2008 || Mount Lemmon || Mount Lemmon Survey || — || align=right | 4.0 km || 
|-id=435 bgcolor=#fefefe
| 251435 ||  || — || January 30, 2008 || Mount Lemmon || Mount Lemmon Survey || — || align=right | 1.0 km || 
|-id=436 bgcolor=#E9E9E9
| 251436 ||  || — || February 2, 2008 || Kitt Peak || Spacewatch || — || align=right | 2.5 km || 
|-id=437 bgcolor=#d6d6d6
| 251437 ||  || — || February 3, 2008 || Kitt Peak || Spacewatch || — || align=right | 3.4 km || 
|-id=438 bgcolor=#E9E9E9
| 251438 ||  || — || February 6, 2008 || Bisei SG Center || BATTeRS || HNS || align=right | 1.7 km || 
|-id=439 bgcolor=#E9E9E9
| 251439 ||  || — || February 2, 2008 || Kitt Peak || Spacewatch || — || align=right | 2.4 km || 
|-id=440 bgcolor=#E9E9E9
| 251440 ||  || — || February 2, 2008 || Kitt Peak || Spacewatch || RAF || align=right | 1.0 km || 
|-id=441 bgcolor=#d6d6d6
| 251441 ||  || — || February 2, 2008 || Kitt Peak || Spacewatch || — || align=right | 3.5 km || 
|-id=442 bgcolor=#d6d6d6
| 251442 ||  || — || February 2, 2008 || Catalina || CSS || — || align=right | 3.5 km || 
|-id=443 bgcolor=#fefefe
| 251443 ||  || — || February 3, 2008 || Catalina || CSS || — || align=right | 2.6 km || 
|-id=444 bgcolor=#fefefe
| 251444 ||  || — || February 7, 2008 || Mount Lemmon || Mount Lemmon Survey || — || align=right | 1.1 km || 
|-id=445 bgcolor=#E9E9E9
| 251445 ||  || — || February 5, 2008 || La Sagra || OAM Obs. || — || align=right | 3.2 km || 
|-id=446 bgcolor=#E9E9E9
| 251446 ||  || — || February 7, 2008 || Kitt Peak || Spacewatch || — || align=right | 1.2 km || 
|-id=447 bgcolor=#E9E9E9
| 251447 ||  || — || February 8, 2008 || Kitt Peak || Spacewatch || — || align=right | 4.1 km || 
|-id=448 bgcolor=#E9E9E9
| 251448 ||  || — || February 10, 2008 || Kitt Peak || Spacewatch || — || align=right | 2.7 km || 
|-id=449 bgcolor=#E9E9E9
| 251449 Olexakorolʹ ||  ||  || February 11, 2008 || Andrushivka || Andrushivka Obs. || — || align=right | 4.7 km || 
|-id=450 bgcolor=#d6d6d6
| 251450 ||  || — || February 11, 2008 || Dauban || F. Kugel || — || align=right | 3.3 km || 
|-id=451 bgcolor=#E9E9E9
| 251451 ||  || — || February 8, 2008 || Kitt Peak || Spacewatch || PAD || align=right | 3.7 km || 
|-id=452 bgcolor=#E9E9E9
| 251452 ||  || — || February 8, 2008 || Kitt Peak || Spacewatch || HEN || align=right | 1.3 km || 
|-id=453 bgcolor=#E9E9E9
| 251453 ||  || — || February 8, 2008 || Kitt Peak || Spacewatch || — || align=right | 2.7 km || 
|-id=454 bgcolor=#E9E9E9
| 251454 ||  || — || February 8, 2008 || Kitt Peak || Spacewatch || — || align=right | 1.8 km || 
|-id=455 bgcolor=#d6d6d6
| 251455 ||  || — || February 8, 2008 || Kitt Peak || Spacewatch || HYG || align=right | 4.4 km || 
|-id=456 bgcolor=#E9E9E9
| 251456 ||  || — || February 8, 2008 || Kitt Peak || Spacewatch || NEM || align=right | 2.9 km || 
|-id=457 bgcolor=#E9E9E9
| 251457 ||  || — || February 9, 2008 || Catalina || CSS || — || align=right | 2.9 km || 
|-id=458 bgcolor=#E9E9E9
| 251458 ||  || — || February 9, 2008 || Catalina || CSS || ADE || align=right | 2.8 km || 
|-id=459 bgcolor=#d6d6d6
| 251459 ||  || — || February 9, 2008 || Catalina || CSS || — || align=right | 5.3 km || 
|-id=460 bgcolor=#d6d6d6
| 251460 ||  || — || February 8, 2008 || Kitt Peak || Spacewatch || — || align=right | 5.5 km || 
|-id=461 bgcolor=#d6d6d6
| 251461 ||  || — || February 9, 2008 || Kitt Peak || Spacewatch || ALA || align=right | 4.7 km || 
|-id=462 bgcolor=#d6d6d6
| 251462 ||  || — || February 13, 2008 || Kitt Peak || Spacewatch || — || align=right | 4.3 km || 
|-id=463 bgcolor=#d6d6d6
| 251463 ||  || — || February 3, 2008 || Kitt Peak || Spacewatch || EOS || align=right | 3.2 km || 
|-id=464 bgcolor=#d6d6d6
| 251464 ||  || — || February 8, 2008 || Mount Lemmon || Mount Lemmon Survey || — || align=right | 4.6 km || 
|-id=465 bgcolor=#E9E9E9
| 251465 ||  || — || February 12, 2008 || Kitt Peak || Spacewatch || — || align=right | 2.6 km || 
|-id=466 bgcolor=#d6d6d6
| 251466 ||  || — || February 10, 2008 || Mount Lemmon || Mount Lemmon Survey || — || align=right | 3.2 km || 
|-id=467 bgcolor=#d6d6d6
| 251467 ||  || — || February 9, 2008 || Socorro || LINEAR || EOS || align=right | 2.9 km || 
|-id=468 bgcolor=#E9E9E9
| 251468 ||  || — || February 26, 2008 || Anderson Mesa || LONEOS || — || align=right | 3.6 km || 
|-id=469 bgcolor=#d6d6d6
| 251469 ||  || — || February 26, 2008 || Mount Lemmon || Mount Lemmon Survey || — || align=right | 2.9 km || 
|-id=470 bgcolor=#E9E9E9
| 251470 ||  || — || February 26, 2008 || Kitt Peak || Spacewatch || — || align=right | 5.5 km || 
|-id=471 bgcolor=#E9E9E9
| 251471 ||  || — || February 26, 2008 || Mount Lemmon || Mount Lemmon Survey || AST || align=right | 2.0 km || 
|-id=472 bgcolor=#E9E9E9
| 251472 ||  || — || February 29, 2008 || Kitt Peak || Spacewatch || — || align=right | 3.1 km || 
|-id=473 bgcolor=#E9E9E9
| 251473 ||  || — || February 27, 2008 || Kitt Peak || Spacewatch || — || align=right | 2.4 km || 
|-id=474 bgcolor=#fefefe
| 251474 ||  || — || February 27, 2008 || Kitt Peak || Spacewatch || NYS || align=right data-sort-value="0.82" | 820 m || 
|-id=475 bgcolor=#E9E9E9
| 251475 ||  || — || February 27, 2008 || Kitt Peak || Spacewatch || HOF || align=right | 3.1 km || 
|-id=476 bgcolor=#d6d6d6
| 251476 ||  || — || February 27, 2008 || Kitt Peak || Spacewatch || — || align=right | 3.7 km || 
|-id=477 bgcolor=#d6d6d6
| 251477 ||  || — || February 29, 2008 || Mount Lemmon || Mount Lemmon Survey || — || align=right | 4.8 km || 
|-id=478 bgcolor=#d6d6d6
| 251478 ||  || — || February 26, 2008 || Kitt Peak || Spacewatch || — || align=right | 3.0 km || 
|-id=479 bgcolor=#d6d6d6
| 251479 ||  || — || February 28, 2008 || Catalina || CSS || — || align=right | 4.9 km || 
|-id=480 bgcolor=#d6d6d6
| 251480 ||  || — || February 28, 2008 || Catalina || CSS || — || align=right | 4.8 km || 
|-id=481 bgcolor=#E9E9E9
| 251481 ||  || — || February 27, 2008 || Kitt Peak || Spacewatch || AGN || align=right | 1.5 km || 
|-id=482 bgcolor=#d6d6d6
| 251482 ||  || — || February 28, 2008 || Mount Lemmon || Mount Lemmon Survey || CHA || align=right | 3.8 km || 
|-id=483 bgcolor=#E9E9E9
| 251483 ||  || — || February 18, 2008 || Mount Lemmon || Mount Lemmon Survey || AGN || align=right | 1.6 km || 
|-id=484 bgcolor=#E9E9E9
| 251484 ||  || — || February 18, 2008 || Mount Lemmon || Mount Lemmon Survey || — || align=right | 2.5 km || 
|-id=485 bgcolor=#E9E9E9
| 251485 Bois-d'Amont ||  ||  || March 2, 2008 || Marly || P. Kocher || — || align=right | 1.9 km || 
|-id=486 bgcolor=#E9E9E9
| 251486 ||  || — || March 2, 2008 || Catalina || CSS || — || align=right | 3.7 km || 
|-id=487 bgcolor=#d6d6d6
| 251487 ||  || — || March 3, 2008 || La Sagra || OAM Obs. || — || align=right | 4.8 km || 
|-id=488 bgcolor=#d6d6d6
| 251488 ||  || — || March 1, 2008 || Kitt Peak || Spacewatch || EOS || align=right | 2.1 km || 
|-id=489 bgcolor=#d6d6d6
| 251489 ||  || — || March 4, 2008 || Mount Lemmon || Mount Lemmon Survey || EOS || align=right | 2.6 km || 
|-id=490 bgcolor=#E9E9E9
| 251490 ||  || — || March 3, 2008 || Kitt Peak || Spacewatch || — || align=right | 3.6 km || 
|-id=491 bgcolor=#d6d6d6
| 251491 ||  || — || March 3, 2008 || Catalina || CSS || EOS || align=right | 3.6 km || 
|-id=492 bgcolor=#E9E9E9
| 251492 ||  || — || March 3, 2008 || Purple Mountain || PMO NEO || — || align=right | 2.1 km || 
|-id=493 bgcolor=#d6d6d6
| 251493 ||  || — || March 4, 2008 || Mount Lemmon || Mount Lemmon Survey || — || align=right | 4.5 km || 
|-id=494 bgcolor=#E9E9E9
| 251494 ||  || — || March 6, 2008 || Kitt Peak || Spacewatch || GEF || align=right | 1.5 km || 
|-id=495 bgcolor=#d6d6d6
| 251495 ||  || — || March 6, 2008 || Mount Lemmon || Mount Lemmon Survey || HYG || align=right | 3.1 km || 
|-id=496 bgcolor=#E9E9E9
| 251496 ||  || — || March 8, 2008 || Catalina || CSS || EUN || align=right | 3.4 km || 
|-id=497 bgcolor=#E9E9E9
| 251497 ||  || — || March 8, 2008 || Mount Lemmon || Mount Lemmon Survey || — || align=right | 3.2 km || 
|-id=498 bgcolor=#d6d6d6
| 251498 ||  || — || March 7, 2008 || Mount Lemmon || Mount Lemmon Survey || KOR || align=right | 1.7 km || 
|-id=499 bgcolor=#fefefe
| 251499 ||  || — || March 7, 2008 || Mount Lemmon || Mount Lemmon Survey || — || align=right | 2.2 km || 
|-id=500 bgcolor=#E9E9E9
| 251500 ||  || — || March 8, 2008 || Mount Lemmon || Mount Lemmon Survey || KON || align=right | 2.3 km || 
|}

251501–251600 

|-bgcolor=#d6d6d6
| 251501 ||  || — || March 10, 2008 || Kitt Peak || Spacewatch || — || align=right | 3.5 km || 
|-id=502 bgcolor=#E9E9E9
| 251502 ||  || — || March 11, 2008 || Kitt Peak || Spacewatch || WIT || align=right | 1.5 km || 
|-id=503 bgcolor=#d6d6d6
| 251503 ||  || — || March 11, 2008 || Kitt Peak || Spacewatch || — || align=right | 5.1 km || 
|-id=504 bgcolor=#E9E9E9
| 251504 ||  || — || March 14, 2008 || Purple Mountain || PMO NEO || — || align=right | 3.5 km || 
|-id=505 bgcolor=#d6d6d6
| 251505 ||  || — || March 8, 2008 || Mount Lemmon || Mount Lemmon Survey || — || align=right | 3.9 km || 
|-id=506 bgcolor=#d6d6d6
| 251506 ||  || — || March 25, 2008 || Kitt Peak || Spacewatch || — || align=right | 4.2 km || 
|-id=507 bgcolor=#E9E9E9
| 251507 ||  || — || March 25, 2008 || Kitt Peak || Spacewatch || — || align=right | 2.8 km || 
|-id=508 bgcolor=#E9E9E9
| 251508 ||  || — || March 25, 2008 || Kitt Peak || Spacewatch || — || align=right | 2.0 km || 
|-id=509 bgcolor=#d6d6d6
| 251509 ||  || — || March 26, 2008 || Mount Lemmon || Mount Lemmon Survey || — || align=right | 4.7 km || 
|-id=510 bgcolor=#d6d6d6
| 251510 ||  || — || March 28, 2008 || Mount Lemmon || Mount Lemmon Survey || KOR || align=right | 1.6 km || 
|-id=511 bgcolor=#d6d6d6
| 251511 ||  || — || March 28, 2008 || Mount Lemmon || Mount Lemmon Survey || — || align=right | 3.9 km || 
|-id=512 bgcolor=#d6d6d6
| 251512 ||  || — || March 28, 2008 || Mount Lemmon || Mount Lemmon Survey || 7:4 || align=right | 5.8 km || 
|-id=513 bgcolor=#d6d6d6
| 251513 ||  || — || March 25, 2008 || Kitt Peak || Spacewatch || — || align=right | 3.6 km || 
|-id=514 bgcolor=#d6d6d6
| 251514 ||  || — || March 28, 2008 || Mount Lemmon || Mount Lemmon Survey || — || align=right | 4.4 km || 
|-id=515 bgcolor=#d6d6d6
| 251515 ||  || — || March 27, 2008 || Mount Lemmon || Mount Lemmon Survey || — || align=right | 5.5 km || 
|-id=516 bgcolor=#d6d6d6
| 251516 ||  || — || March 27, 2008 || Mount Lemmon || Mount Lemmon Survey || NAE || align=right | 4.2 km || 
|-id=517 bgcolor=#d6d6d6
| 251517 ||  || — || March 31, 2008 || Kitt Peak || Spacewatch || — || align=right | 4.2 km || 
|-id=518 bgcolor=#d6d6d6
| 251518 ||  || — || March 31, 2008 || Mount Lemmon || Mount Lemmon Survey || 7:4 || align=right | 5.6 km || 
|-id=519 bgcolor=#d6d6d6
| 251519 ||  || — || March 29, 2008 || Catalina || CSS || EUP || align=right | 5.3 km || 
|-id=520 bgcolor=#E9E9E9
| 251520 ||  || — || March 29, 2008 || Kitt Peak || Spacewatch || — || align=right | 4.0 km || 
|-id=521 bgcolor=#d6d6d6
| 251521 ||  || — || April 6, 2008 || Kanab || E. E. Sheridan || — || align=right | 4.4 km || 
|-id=522 bgcolor=#d6d6d6
| 251522 ||  || — || April 3, 2008 || Mount Lemmon || Mount Lemmon Survey || TEL || align=right | 1.9 km || 
|-id=523 bgcolor=#E9E9E9
| 251523 ||  || — || April 5, 2008 || Kitt Peak || Spacewatch || WIT || align=right | 1.2 km || 
|-id=524 bgcolor=#d6d6d6
| 251524 ||  || — || April 5, 2008 || Mount Lemmon || Mount Lemmon Survey || — || align=right | 3.8 km || 
|-id=525 bgcolor=#E9E9E9
| 251525 ||  || — || April 5, 2008 || Catalina || CSS || — || align=right | 2.7 km || 
|-id=526 bgcolor=#d6d6d6
| 251526 ||  || — || April 9, 2008 || Kitt Peak || Spacewatch || KAR || align=right | 1.7 km || 
|-id=527 bgcolor=#d6d6d6
| 251527 ||  || — || April 8, 2008 || Kitt Peak || Spacewatch || — || align=right | 4.7 km || 
|-id=528 bgcolor=#C2FFFF
| 251528 ||  || — || April 14, 2008 || Mount Lemmon || Mount Lemmon Survey || L5 || align=right | 11 km || 
|-id=529 bgcolor=#d6d6d6
| 251529 ||  || — || April 24, 2008 || Kitt Peak || Spacewatch || EOS || align=right | 2.5 km || 
|-id=530 bgcolor=#d6d6d6
| 251530 ||  || — || April 25, 2008 || Mount Lemmon || Mount Lemmon Survey || — || align=right | 4.3 km || 
|-id=531 bgcolor=#d6d6d6
| 251531 ||  || — || April 28, 2008 || Kitt Peak || Spacewatch || — || align=right | 4.2 km || 
|-id=532 bgcolor=#d6d6d6
| 251532 ||  || — || April 29, 2008 || Kitt Peak || Spacewatch || KOR || align=right | 1.7 km || 
|-id=533 bgcolor=#d6d6d6
| 251533 ||  || — || May 4, 2008 || Kitt Peak || Spacewatch || — || align=right | 5.0 km || 
|-id=534 bgcolor=#C2FFFF
| 251534 ||  || — || May 27, 2008 || Kitt Peak || Spacewatch || L5 || align=right | 11 km || 
|-id=535 bgcolor=#C2FFFF
| 251535 ||  || — || May 27, 2008 || Kitt Peak || Spacewatch || L5 || align=right | 9.4 km || 
|-id=536 bgcolor=#C2FFFF
| 251536 ||  || — || September 22, 2008 || Kitt Peak || Spacewatch || L4 || align=right | 14 km || 
|-id=537 bgcolor=#fefefe
| 251537 ||  || — || October 26, 2008 || Catalina || CSS || H || align=right data-sort-value="0.92" | 920 m || 
|-id=538 bgcolor=#fefefe
| 251538 ||  || — || November 21, 2008 || Mount Lemmon || Mount Lemmon Survey || H || align=right | 1.1 km || 
|-id=539 bgcolor=#fefefe
| 251539 ||  || — || December 2, 2008 || Kitt Peak || Spacewatch || H || align=right data-sort-value="0.84" | 840 m || 
|-id=540 bgcolor=#d6d6d6
| 251540 ||  || — || December 19, 2008 || La Sagra || OAM Obs. || HYG || align=right | 5.1 km || 
|-id=541 bgcolor=#d6d6d6
| 251541 ||  || — || December 29, 2008 || Mount Lemmon || Mount Lemmon Survey || — || align=right | 2.2 km || 
|-id=542 bgcolor=#fefefe
| 251542 ||  || — || January 7, 2009 || Kitt Peak || Spacewatch || — || align=right | 1.1 km || 
|-id=543 bgcolor=#fefefe
| 251543 ||  || — || January 18, 2009 || Purple Mountain || PMO NEO || H || align=right | 1.0 km || 
|-id=544 bgcolor=#fefefe
| 251544 ||  || — || January 25, 2009 || Catalina || CSS || H || align=right data-sort-value="0.82" | 820 m || 
|-id=545 bgcolor=#fefefe
| 251545 ||  || — || January 25, 2009 || Kitt Peak || Spacewatch || NYS || align=right data-sort-value="0.72" | 720 m || 
|-id=546 bgcolor=#fefefe
| 251546 ||  || — || January 30, 2009 || Mount Lemmon || Mount Lemmon Survey || — || align=right data-sort-value="0.95" | 950 m || 
|-id=547 bgcolor=#fefefe
| 251547 ||  || — || January 31, 2009 || Kitt Peak || Spacewatch || — || align=right data-sort-value="0.93" | 930 m || 
|-id=548 bgcolor=#fefefe
| 251548 ||  || — || January 30, 2009 || Mount Lemmon || Mount Lemmon Survey || — || align=right data-sort-value="0.81" | 810 m || 
|-id=549 bgcolor=#fefefe
| 251549 ||  || — || February 1, 2009 || Kitt Peak || Spacewatch || — || align=right data-sort-value="0.97" | 970 m || 
|-id=550 bgcolor=#fefefe
| 251550 ||  || — || February 1, 2009 || Kitt Peak || Spacewatch || FLO || align=right data-sort-value="0.84" | 840 m || 
|-id=551 bgcolor=#fefefe
| 251551 ||  || — || February 1, 2009 || Kitt Peak || Spacewatch || FLO || align=right data-sort-value="0.78" | 780 m || 
|-id=552 bgcolor=#fefefe
| 251552 ||  || — || February 14, 2009 || Kitt Peak || Spacewatch || — || align=right | 1.1 km || 
|-id=553 bgcolor=#fefefe
| 251553 ||  || — || February 14, 2009 || La Sagra || OAM Obs. || — || align=right | 1.2 km || 
|-id=554 bgcolor=#E9E9E9
| 251554 ||  || — || February 4, 2009 || Mount Lemmon || Mount Lemmon Survey || DOR || align=right | 2.8 km || 
|-id=555 bgcolor=#fefefe
| 251555 ||  || — || February 2, 2009 || Kitt Peak || Spacewatch || — || align=right | 1.0 km || 
|-id=556 bgcolor=#fefefe
| 251556 ||  || — || February 20, 2009 || Calvin-Rehoboth || Calvin–Rehoboth Obs. || — || align=right data-sort-value="0.94" | 940 m || 
|-id=557 bgcolor=#fefefe
| 251557 ||  || — || February 16, 2009 || La Sagra || OAM Obs. || — || align=right | 1.0 km || 
|-id=558 bgcolor=#fefefe
| 251558 ||  || — || February 19, 2009 || Kitt Peak || Spacewatch || — || align=right | 1.2 km || 
|-id=559 bgcolor=#E9E9E9
| 251559 ||  || — || February 23, 2009 || Socorro || LINEAR || — || align=right | 2.2 km || 
|-id=560 bgcolor=#E9E9E9
| 251560 ||  || — || February 22, 2009 || Kitt Peak || Spacewatch || — || align=right | 2.1 km || 
|-id=561 bgcolor=#fefefe
| 251561 ||  || — || February 22, 2009 || Kitt Peak || Spacewatch || V || align=right | 1.0 km || 
|-id=562 bgcolor=#fefefe
| 251562 ||  || — || February 19, 2009 || La Sagra || OAM Obs. || V || align=right data-sort-value="0.99" | 990 m || 
|-id=563 bgcolor=#fefefe
| 251563 ||  || — || February 27, 2009 || Kitt Peak || Spacewatch || V || align=right data-sort-value="0.85" | 850 m || 
|-id=564 bgcolor=#E9E9E9
| 251564 ||  || — || February 27, 2009 || Kitt Peak || Spacewatch || — || align=right | 2.8 km || 
|-id=565 bgcolor=#fefefe
| 251565 ||  || — || February 27, 2009 || Kitt Peak || Spacewatch || CLA || align=right | 1.9 km || 
|-id=566 bgcolor=#E9E9E9
| 251566 ||  || — || February 20, 2009 || Kitt Peak || Spacewatch || — || align=right | 2.7 km || 
|-id=567 bgcolor=#fefefe
| 251567 ||  || — || February 26, 2009 || Kitt Peak || Spacewatch || — || align=right data-sort-value="0.86" | 860 m || 
|-id=568 bgcolor=#FA8072
| 251568 ||  || — || March 15, 2009 || Kitt Peak || Spacewatch || — || align=right data-sort-value="0.97" | 970 m || 
|-id=569 bgcolor=#fefefe
| 251569 ||  || — || March 15, 2009 || Kitt Peak || Spacewatch || — || align=right data-sort-value="0.78" | 780 m || 
|-id=570 bgcolor=#fefefe
| 251570 ||  || — || March 3, 2009 || Kitt Peak || Spacewatch || MAS || align=right data-sort-value="0.98" | 980 m || 
|-id=571 bgcolor=#E9E9E9
| 251571 ||  || — || March 2, 2009 || Mount Lemmon || Mount Lemmon Survey || — || align=right | 1.3 km || 
|-id=572 bgcolor=#fefefe
| 251572 ||  || — || March 16, 2009 || La Sagra || OAM Obs. || — || align=right | 1.2 km || 
|-id=573 bgcolor=#fefefe
| 251573 ||  || — || March 16, 2009 || Kitt Peak || Spacewatch || V || align=right data-sort-value="0.78" | 780 m || 
|-id=574 bgcolor=#fefefe
| 251574 ||  || — || March 19, 2009 || La Sagra || OAM Obs. || — || align=right | 1.9 km || 
|-id=575 bgcolor=#fefefe
| 251575 ||  || — || March 23, 2009 || La Sagra || OAM Obs. || SUL || align=right | 2.9 km || 
|-id=576 bgcolor=#d6d6d6
| 251576 ||  || — || March 19, 2009 || Mount Lemmon || Mount Lemmon Survey || — || align=right | 4.6 km || 
|-id=577 bgcolor=#E9E9E9
| 251577 ||  || — || March 21, 2009 || La Sagra || OAM Obs. || — || align=right | 2.3 km || 
|-id=578 bgcolor=#E9E9E9
| 251578 ||  || — || March 27, 2009 || Kitt Peak || Spacewatch || — || align=right | 1.6 km || 
|-id=579 bgcolor=#d6d6d6
| 251579 ||  || — || March 19, 2009 || Catalina || CSS || — || align=right | 2.7 km || 
|-id=580 bgcolor=#E9E9E9
| 251580 ||  || — || March 27, 2009 || Catalina || CSS || — || align=right | 2.7 km || 
|-id=581 bgcolor=#d6d6d6
| 251581 ||  || — || March 16, 2009 || Catalina || CSS || Tj (2.9) || align=right | 6.5 km || 
|-id=582 bgcolor=#E9E9E9
| 251582 ||  || — || March 19, 2009 || Catalina || CSS || — || align=right | 1.5 km || 
|-id=583 bgcolor=#d6d6d6
| 251583 ||  || — || March 16, 2009 || Kitt Peak || Spacewatch || — || align=right | 2.5 km || 
|-id=584 bgcolor=#fefefe
| 251584 ||  || — || March 21, 2009 || Kitt Peak || Spacewatch || — || align=right data-sort-value="0.78" | 780 m || 
|-id=585 bgcolor=#d6d6d6
| 251585 ||  || — || March 31, 2009 || Mount Lemmon || Mount Lemmon Survey || — || align=right | 2.5 km || 
|-id=586 bgcolor=#E9E9E9
| 251586 ||  || — || March 16, 2009 || Catalina || CSS || — || align=right | 2.1 km || 
|-id=587 bgcolor=#fefefe
| 251587 ||  || — || March 21, 2009 || Mount Lemmon || Mount Lemmon Survey || MAS || align=right data-sort-value="0.90" | 900 m || 
|-id=588 bgcolor=#d6d6d6
| 251588 ||  || — || March 24, 2009 || Kitt Peak || Spacewatch || — || align=right | 4.5 km || 
|-id=589 bgcolor=#E9E9E9
| 251589 ||  || — || April 17, 2009 || Catalina || CSS || — || align=right | 1.5 km || 
|-id=590 bgcolor=#E9E9E9
| 251590 ||  || — || April 17, 2009 || Kitt Peak || Spacewatch || — || align=right | 1.3 km || 
|-id=591 bgcolor=#fefefe
| 251591 ||  || — || April 18, 2009 || Mount Lemmon || Mount Lemmon Survey || — || align=right data-sort-value="0.74" | 740 m || 
|-id=592 bgcolor=#E9E9E9
| 251592 ||  || — || April 18, 2009 || Piszkéstető || K. Sárneczky || MIS || align=right | 2.8 km || 
|-id=593 bgcolor=#fefefe
| 251593 ||  || — || April 17, 2009 || Kitt Peak || Spacewatch || V || align=right data-sort-value="0.82" | 820 m || 
|-id=594 bgcolor=#fefefe
| 251594 ||  || — || April 18, 2009 || Kitt Peak || Spacewatch || MAS || align=right data-sort-value="0.86" | 860 m || 
|-id=595 bgcolor=#fefefe
| 251595 Rudolfböttger ||  ||  || April 20, 2009 || Taunus || S. Karge, R. Kling || FLO || align=right | 1.2 km || 
|-id=596 bgcolor=#d6d6d6
| 251596 ||  || — || April 18, 2009 || Kitt Peak || Spacewatch || LIX || align=right | 5.3 km || 
|-id=597 bgcolor=#E9E9E9
| 251597 ||  || — || April 18, 2009 || Mount Lemmon || Mount Lemmon Survey || MAR || align=right | 1.6 km || 
|-id=598 bgcolor=#E9E9E9
| 251598 ||  || — || April 20, 2009 || Kitt Peak || Spacewatch || — || align=right | 1.4 km || 
|-id=599 bgcolor=#fefefe
| 251599 ||  || — || April 22, 2009 || Mount Lemmon || Mount Lemmon Survey || V || align=right data-sort-value="0.95" | 950 m || 
|-id=600 bgcolor=#d6d6d6
| 251600 ||  || — || April 22, 2009 || Mount Lemmon || Mount Lemmon Survey || — || align=right | 4.0 km || 
|}

251601–251700 

|-bgcolor=#E9E9E9
| 251601 ||  || — || April 28, 2009 || Kitt Peak || Spacewatch || KON || align=right | 2.5 km || 
|-id=602 bgcolor=#E9E9E9
| 251602 ||  || — || April 24, 2009 || Mount Lemmon || Mount Lemmon Survey || — || align=right | 1.3 km || 
|-id=603 bgcolor=#fefefe
| 251603 ||  || — || April 27, 2009 || Kitt Peak || Spacewatch || — || align=right | 1.0 km || 
|-id=604 bgcolor=#E9E9E9
| 251604 ||  || — || April 29, 2009 || La Sagra || OAM Obs. || — || align=right | 3.4 km || 
|-id=605 bgcolor=#fefefe
| 251605 ||  || — || April 18, 2009 || Mount Lemmon || Mount Lemmon Survey || — || align=right | 1.2 km || 
|-id=606 bgcolor=#fefefe
| 251606 ||  || — || April 21, 2009 || La Sagra || OAM Obs. || — || align=right | 1.2 km || 
|-id=607 bgcolor=#fefefe
| 251607 ||  || — || April 28, 2009 || Cerro Burek || Alianza S4 Obs. || — || align=right | 1.2 km || 
|-id=608 bgcolor=#E9E9E9
| 251608 ||  || — || April 20, 2009 || Kitt Peak || Spacewatch || — || align=right | 1.7 km || 
|-id=609 bgcolor=#d6d6d6
| 251609 ||  || — || April 20, 2009 || Kitt Peak || Spacewatch || — || align=right | 3.2 km || 
|-id=610 bgcolor=#E9E9E9
| 251610 ||  || — || April 23, 2009 || Kitt Peak || Spacewatch || WIT || align=right | 1.3 km || 
|-id=611 bgcolor=#E9E9E9
| 251611 ||  || — || April 20, 2009 || Mount Lemmon || Mount Lemmon Survey || — || align=right | 1.6 km || 
|-id=612 bgcolor=#E9E9E9
| 251612 ||  || — || April 19, 2009 || Kitt Peak || Spacewatch || — || align=right | 2.3 km || 
|-id=613 bgcolor=#E9E9E9
| 251613 ||  || — || April 21, 2009 || Kitt Peak || Spacewatch || — || align=right | 2.4 km || 
|-id=614 bgcolor=#E9E9E9
| 251614 ||  || — || May 13, 2009 || Kitt Peak || Spacewatch || GEF || align=right | 1.5 km || 
|-id=615 bgcolor=#E9E9E9
| 251615 ||  || — || May 13, 2009 || Kitt Peak || Spacewatch || — || align=right | 2.1 km || 
|-id=616 bgcolor=#d6d6d6
| 251616 ||  || — || May 13, 2009 || Kitt Peak || Spacewatch || EOS || align=right | 2.3 km || 
|-id=617 bgcolor=#E9E9E9
| 251617 ||  || — || May 5, 2009 || Kitt Peak || Spacewatch || EUN || align=right | 1.5 km || 
|-id=618 bgcolor=#E9E9E9
| 251618 ||  || — || May 26, 2009 || Catalina || CSS || — || align=right | 2.1 km || 
|-id=619 bgcolor=#E9E9E9
| 251619 ||  || — || June 13, 2009 || Skylive Obs. || F. Tozzi || MAR || align=right | 1.7 km || 
|-id=620 bgcolor=#d6d6d6
| 251620 ||  || — || June 16, 2009 || Kitt Peak || Spacewatch || — || align=right | 4.4 km || 
|-id=621 bgcolor=#fefefe
| 251621 Lüthen ||  ||  || September 10, 2009 || ESA OGS || M. Busch, R. Kresken || — || align=right | 1.3 km || 
|-id=622 bgcolor=#d6d6d6
| 251622 ||  || — || October 21, 2009 || Mount Lemmon || Mount Lemmon Survey || — || align=right | 3.4 km || 
|-id=623 bgcolor=#E9E9E9
| 251623 ||  || — || November 9, 2009 || Catalina || CSS || PAD || align=right | 4.3 km || 
|-id=624 bgcolor=#d6d6d6
| 251624 ||  || — || December 15, 2009 || Mount Lemmon || Mount Lemmon Survey || — || align=right | 4.0 km || 
|-id=625 bgcolor=#E9E9E9
| 251625 Timconrow ||  ||  || February 17, 2010 || WISE || WISE || — || align=right | 4.1 km || 
|-id=626 bgcolor=#d6d6d6
| 251626 ||  || — || March 22, 2010 || ESA OGS || ESA OGS || — || align=right | 4.6 km || 
|-id=627 bgcolor=#d6d6d6
| 251627 Joyceearl ||  ||  || May 2, 2010 || WISE || WISE || — || align=right | 4.8 km || 
|-id=628 bgcolor=#d6d6d6
| 251628 ||  || — || May 12, 2010 || WISE || WISE || EUP || align=right | 6.0 km || 
|-id=629 bgcolor=#E9E9E9
| 251629 ||  || — || May 12, 2010 || WISE || WISE || — || align=right | 2.1 km || 
|-id=630 bgcolor=#fefefe
| 251630 ||  || — || May 13, 2010 || WISE || WISE || — || align=right | 3.1 km || 
|-id=631 bgcolor=#E9E9E9
| 251631 ||  || — || May 17, 2010 || WISE || WISE || JUN || align=right | 1.9 km || 
|-id=632 bgcolor=#E9E9E9
| 251632 ||  || — || May 18, 2010 || WISE || WISE || — || align=right | 2.7 km || 
|-id=633 bgcolor=#E9E9E9
| 251633 ||  || — || May 21, 2010 || WISE || WISE || PAD || align=right | 3.8 km || 
|-id=634 bgcolor=#E9E9E9
| 251634 ||  || — || May 22, 2010 || WISE || WISE || — || align=right | 1.6 km || 
|-id=635 bgcolor=#E9E9E9
| 251635 ||  || — || May 23, 2010 || WISE || WISE || — || align=right | 1.8 km || 
|-id=636 bgcolor=#d6d6d6
| 251636 ||  || — || May 24, 2010 || WISE || WISE || THM || align=right | 4.3 km || 
|-id=637 bgcolor=#d6d6d6
| 251637 ||  || — || May 24, 2010 || WISE || WISE || HYG || align=right | 4.4 km || 
|-id=638 bgcolor=#d6d6d6
| 251638 ||  || — || May 26, 2010 || WISE || WISE || HYG || align=right | 3.8 km || 
|-id=639 bgcolor=#E9E9E9
| 251639 ||  || — || May 26, 2010 || WISE || WISE || — || align=right | 4.6 km || 
|-id=640 bgcolor=#d6d6d6
| 251640 ||  || — || May 30, 2010 || WISE || WISE || HYG || align=right | 5.0 km || 
|-id=641 bgcolor=#E9E9E9
| 251641 ||  || — || June 10, 2010 || WISE || WISE || EUN || align=right | 1.7 km || 
|-id=642 bgcolor=#d6d6d6
| 251642 ||  || — || June 13, 2010 || WISE || WISE || — || align=right | 5.3 km || 
|-id=643 bgcolor=#fefefe
| 251643 ||  || — || June 10, 2010 || Mount Lemmon || Mount Lemmon Survey || FLO || align=right data-sort-value="0.72" | 720 m || 
|-id=644 bgcolor=#fefefe
| 251644 ||  || — || June 19, 2010 || Mount Lemmon || Mount Lemmon Survey || — || align=right | 1.2 km || 
|-id=645 bgcolor=#d6d6d6
| 251645 ||  || — || July 6, 2010 || Kitt Peak || Spacewatch || URS || align=right | 5.2 km || 
|-id=646 bgcolor=#fefefe
| 251646 ||  || — || July 20, 2010 || La Sagra || OAM Obs. || NYS || align=right | 1.1 km || 
|-id=647 bgcolor=#E9E9E9
| 251647 || 2834 P-L || — || September 24, 1960 || Palomar || PLS || — || align=right | 1.6 km || 
|-id=648 bgcolor=#E9E9E9
| 251648 ||  || — || September 24, 1960 || Palomar || PLS || — || align=right | 1.0 km || 
|-id=649 bgcolor=#E9E9E9
| 251649 ||  || — || September 29, 1973 || Palomar || PLS || — || align=right | 2.3 km || 
|-id=650 bgcolor=#fefefe
| 251650 ||  || — || October 16, 1977 || Palomar || PLS || — || align=right | 1.5 km || 
|-id=651 bgcolor=#fefefe
| 251651 ||  || — || October 16, 1977 || Palomar || PLS || — || align=right | 1.0 km || 
|-id=652 bgcolor=#fefefe
| 251652 ||  || — || March 1, 1981 || Siding Spring || S. J. Bus || FLO || align=right data-sort-value="0.85" | 850 m || 
|-id=653 bgcolor=#fefefe
| 251653 ||  || — || October 6, 1991 || Palomar || A. Lowe || — || align=right | 1.3 km || 
|-id=654 bgcolor=#E9E9E9
| 251654 ||  || — || September 15, 1993 || Calar Alto || K. Birkle, H. Boehnhardt || — || align=right | 4.4 km || 
|-id=655 bgcolor=#fefefe
| 251655 ||  || — || October 15, 1993 || Kitt Peak || Spacewatch || — || align=right data-sort-value="0.78" | 780 m || 
|-id=656 bgcolor=#E9E9E9
| 251656 ||  || — || October 20, 1993 || La Silla || E. W. Elst || — || align=right | 2.1 km || 
|-id=657 bgcolor=#d6d6d6
| 251657 ||  || — || January 8, 1994 || Kitt Peak || Spacewatch || THM || align=right | 2.5 km || 
|-id=658 bgcolor=#E9E9E9
| 251658 ||  || — || April 3, 1994 || Kitt Peak || Spacewatch || 526 || align=right | 2.6 km || 
|-id=659 bgcolor=#fefefe
| 251659 ||  || — || May 4, 1994 || Kitt Peak || Spacewatch || NYS || align=right data-sort-value="0.83" | 830 m || 
|-id=660 bgcolor=#d6d6d6
| 251660 ||  || — || September 12, 1994 || Kitt Peak || Spacewatch || — || align=right | 2.5 km || 
|-id=661 bgcolor=#fefefe
| 251661 ||  || — || September 28, 1994 || Kitt Peak || Spacewatch || — || align=right data-sort-value="0.86" | 860 m || 
|-id=662 bgcolor=#d6d6d6
| 251662 ||  || — || September 28, 1994 || Kitt Peak || Spacewatch || — || align=right | 3.0 km || 
|-id=663 bgcolor=#d6d6d6
| 251663 ||  || — || September 29, 1994 || Kitt Peak || Spacewatch || EOS || align=right | 3.9 km || 
|-id=664 bgcolor=#E9E9E9
| 251664 ||  || — || October 28, 1994 || Kitt Peak || Spacewatch || — || align=right | 3.2 km || 
|-id=665 bgcolor=#E9E9E9
| 251665 ||  || — || December 31, 1994 || Kitt Peak || Spacewatch || — || align=right | 1.5 km || 
|-id=666 bgcolor=#E9E9E9
| 251666 ||  || — || January 29, 1995 || Kitt Peak || Spacewatch || RAF || align=right | 1.5 km || 
|-id=667 bgcolor=#fefefe
| 251667 ||  || — || March 23, 1995 || Kitt Peak || Spacewatch || V || align=right data-sort-value="0.92" | 920 m || 
|-id=668 bgcolor=#fefefe
| 251668 ||  || — || March 23, 1995 || Kitt Peak || Spacewatch || FLO || align=right data-sort-value="0.89" | 890 m || 
|-id=669 bgcolor=#E9E9E9
| 251669 ||  || — || March 25, 1995 || Kitt Peak || Spacewatch || — || align=right | 1.8 km || 
|-id=670 bgcolor=#fefefe
| 251670 ||  || — || August 27, 1995 || Kitt Peak || Spacewatch || — || align=right | 1.1 km || 
|-id=671 bgcolor=#fefefe
| 251671 ||  || — || September 17, 1995 || Kitt Peak || Spacewatch || V || align=right data-sort-value="0.67" | 670 m || 
|-id=672 bgcolor=#fefefe
| 251672 ||  || — || September 18, 1995 || Kitt Peak || Spacewatch || EUT || align=right data-sort-value="0.99" | 990 m || 
|-id=673 bgcolor=#fefefe
| 251673 ||  || — || September 18, 1995 || Kitt Peak || Spacewatch || NYS || align=right data-sort-value="0.66" | 660 m || 
|-id=674 bgcolor=#d6d6d6
| 251674 ||  || — || September 19, 1995 || Kitt Peak || Spacewatch || KOR || align=right | 1.4 km || 
|-id=675 bgcolor=#d6d6d6
| 251675 ||  || — || September 19, 1995 || Kitt Peak || Spacewatch || — || align=right | 2.3 km || 
|-id=676 bgcolor=#fefefe
| 251676 ||  || — || September 21, 1995 || Kitt Peak || Spacewatch || V || align=right data-sort-value="0.78" | 780 m || 
|-id=677 bgcolor=#d6d6d6
| 251677 ||  || — || September 24, 1995 || Kitt Peak || Spacewatch || KOR || align=right | 1.5 km || 
|-id=678 bgcolor=#d6d6d6
| 251678 ||  || — || September 25, 1995 || Kitt Peak || Spacewatch || — || align=right | 2.7 km || 
|-id=679 bgcolor=#fefefe
| 251679 ||  || — || October 15, 1995 || Kitt Peak || Spacewatch || — || align=right | 1.0 km || 
|-id=680 bgcolor=#d6d6d6
| 251680 ||  || — || October 15, 1995 || Kitt Peak || Spacewatch || KOR || align=right | 1.4 km || 
|-id=681 bgcolor=#fefefe
| 251681 ||  || — || October 18, 1995 || Kitt Peak || Spacewatch || NYS || align=right data-sort-value="0.80" | 800 m || 
|-id=682 bgcolor=#fefefe
| 251682 ||  || — || October 20, 1995 || Kitt Peak || Spacewatch || MAS || align=right data-sort-value="0.97" | 970 m || 
|-id=683 bgcolor=#fefefe
| 251683 ||  || — || October 21, 1995 || Kitt Peak || Spacewatch || — || align=right | 1.1 km || 
|-id=684 bgcolor=#d6d6d6
| 251684 ||  || — || October 22, 1995 || Kitt Peak || Spacewatch || — || align=right | 4.5 km || 
|-id=685 bgcolor=#fefefe
| 251685 ||  || — || October 23, 1995 || Kitt Peak || Spacewatch || — || align=right data-sort-value="0.95" | 950 m || 
|-id=686 bgcolor=#fefefe
| 251686 ||  || — || October 24, 1995 || Kitt Peak || Spacewatch || V || align=right data-sort-value="0.91" | 910 m || 
|-id=687 bgcolor=#fefefe
| 251687 ||  || — || October 17, 1995 || Kitt Peak || Spacewatch || CLA || align=right | 1.8 km || 
|-id=688 bgcolor=#fefefe
| 251688 ||  || — || October 19, 1995 || Kitt Peak || Spacewatch || MAS || align=right data-sort-value="0.66" | 660 m || 
|-id=689 bgcolor=#fefefe
| 251689 ||  || — || November 14, 1995 || Kitt Peak || Spacewatch || MAS || align=right | 1.0 km || 
|-id=690 bgcolor=#d6d6d6
| 251690 ||  || — || November 14, 1995 || Kitt Peak || Spacewatch || EOS || align=right | 2.2 km || 
|-id=691 bgcolor=#fefefe
| 251691 ||  || — || November 15, 1995 || Kitt Peak || Spacewatch || — || align=right | 1.1 km || 
|-id=692 bgcolor=#d6d6d6
| 251692 ||  || — || November 16, 1995 || Kitt Peak || Spacewatch || 3:2 || align=right | 4.8 km || 
|-id=693 bgcolor=#d6d6d6
| 251693 ||  || — || November 17, 1995 || Kitt Peak || Spacewatch || — || align=right | 3.5 km || 
|-id=694 bgcolor=#fefefe
| 251694 ||  || — || November 19, 1995 || Kitt Peak || Spacewatch || — || align=right | 1.0 km || 
|-id=695 bgcolor=#fefefe
| 251695 ||  || — || November 20, 1995 || Kitt Peak || Spacewatch || NYS || align=right data-sort-value="0.86" | 860 m || 
|-id=696 bgcolor=#d6d6d6
| 251696 ||  || — || December 16, 1995 || Kitt Peak || Spacewatch || — || align=right | 4.6 km || 
|-id=697 bgcolor=#d6d6d6
| 251697 ||  || — || January 13, 1996 || Kitt Peak || Spacewatch || — || align=right | 2.4 km || 
|-id=698 bgcolor=#E9E9E9
| 251698 || 1996 DJ || — || February 18, 1996 || Siding Spring || M. Hartley || — || align=right | 4.1 km || 
|-id=699 bgcolor=#fefefe
| 251699 ||  || — || March 21, 1996 || Socorro || Lincoln Lab ETS || H || align=right data-sort-value="0.55" | 550 m || 
|-id=700 bgcolor=#fefefe
| 251700 ||  || — || September 6, 1996 || Kitt Peak || Spacewatch || — || align=right data-sort-value="0.78" | 780 m || 
|}

251701–251800 

|-bgcolor=#C2FFFF
| 251701 ||  || — || October 4, 1996 || Kitt Peak || Spacewatch || L4 || align=right | 12 km || 
|-id=702 bgcolor=#C2FFFF
| 251702 ||  || — || October 4, 1996 || Kitt Peak || Spacewatch || L4 || align=right | 12 km || 
|-id=703 bgcolor=#fefefe
| 251703 ||  || — || October 4, 1996 || Kitt Peak || Spacewatch || — || align=right | 1.6 km || 
|-id=704 bgcolor=#E9E9E9
| 251704 ||  || — || October 7, 1996 || Kitt Peak || Spacewatch || — || align=right | 2.8 km || 
|-id=705 bgcolor=#FA8072
| 251705 || 1996 UJ || — || October 17, 1996 || Prescott || P. G. Comba || — || align=right | 1.2 km || 
|-id=706 bgcolor=#fefefe
| 251706 ||  || — || December 4, 1996 || Kitt Peak || Spacewatch || — || align=right | 1.2 km || 
|-id=707 bgcolor=#E9E9E9
| 251707 ||  || — || December 14, 1996 || Kitt Peak || Spacewatch || — || align=right | 3.2 km || 
|-id=708 bgcolor=#fefefe
| 251708 ||  || — || December 15, 1996 || Saji || Saji Obs. || H || align=right data-sort-value="0.92" | 920 m || 
|-id=709 bgcolor=#fefefe
| 251709 ||  || — || January 2, 1997 || Chichibu || N. Satō || NYS || align=right | 1.0 km || 
|-id=710 bgcolor=#fefefe
| 251710 ||  || — || February 2, 1997 || Kitt Peak || Spacewatch || — || align=right | 1.0 km || 
|-id=711 bgcolor=#fefefe
| 251711 ||  || — || February 3, 1997 || Kitt Peak || Spacewatch || — || align=right data-sort-value="0.80" | 800 m || 
|-id=712 bgcolor=#fefefe
| 251712 ||  || — || February 9, 1997 || Kitt Peak || Spacewatch || NYS || align=right data-sort-value="0.71" | 710 m || 
|-id=713 bgcolor=#d6d6d6
| 251713 ||  || — || March 5, 1997 || Kitt Peak || Spacewatch || — || align=right | 2.4 km || 
|-id=714 bgcolor=#fefefe
| 251714 ||  || — || April 8, 1997 || Kitt Peak || Spacewatch || MAS || align=right data-sort-value="0.85" | 850 m || 
|-id=715 bgcolor=#d6d6d6
| 251715 ||  || — || April 3, 1997 || Socorro || LINEAR || — || align=right | 5.0 km || 
|-id=716 bgcolor=#d6d6d6
| 251716 ||  || — || April 3, 1997 || Socorro || LINEAR || TEL || align=right | 2.1 km || 
|-id=717 bgcolor=#E9E9E9
| 251717 ||  || — || April 30, 1997 || Socorro || LINEAR || — || align=right | 1.3 km || 
|-id=718 bgcolor=#E9E9E9
| 251718 ||  || — || September 28, 1997 || Kitt Peak || Spacewatch || — || align=right | 1.3 km || 
|-id=719 bgcolor=#E9E9E9
| 251719 ||  || — || September 28, 1997 || Kitt Peak || Spacewatch || EUN || align=right | 1.8 km || 
|-id=720 bgcolor=#E9E9E9
| 251720 ||  || — || September 25, 1997 || Bergisch Gladbac || W. Bickel || — || align=right data-sort-value="0.92" | 920 m || 
|-id=721 bgcolor=#E9E9E9
| 251721 ||  || — || October 19, 1997 || Kleť || Kleť Obs. || GER || align=right | 1.7 km || 
|-id=722 bgcolor=#FFC2E0
| 251722 ||  || — || October 23, 1997 || Kitt Peak || Spacewatch || APOPHAcritical || align=right data-sort-value="0.41" | 410 m || 
|-id=723 bgcolor=#E9E9E9
| 251723 ||  || — || November 20, 1997 || Kitt Peak || Spacewatch || — || align=right | 1.8 km || 
|-id=724 bgcolor=#E9E9E9
| 251724 ||  || — || November 20, 1997 || Kitt Peak || Spacewatch || — || align=right | 2.3 km || 
|-id=725 bgcolor=#E9E9E9
| 251725 ||  || — || January 22, 1998 || Kitt Peak || Spacewatch || — || align=right | 3.6 km || 
|-id=726 bgcolor=#E9E9E9
| 251726 ||  || — || February 18, 1998 || Kleť || Kleť Obs. || XIZ || align=right | 2.1 km || 
|-id=727 bgcolor=#fefefe
| 251727 ||  || — || March 20, 1998 || Socorro || LINEAR || — || align=right | 1.1 km || 
|-id=728 bgcolor=#fefefe
| 251728 ||  || — || March 20, 1998 || Socorro || LINEAR || NYS || align=right | 1.0 km || 
|-id=729 bgcolor=#E9E9E9
| 251729 ||  || — || March 20, 1998 || Socorro || LINEAR || — || align=right | 3.3 km || 
|-id=730 bgcolor=#fefefe
| 251730 ||  || — || April 19, 1998 || Kitt Peak || Spacewatch || NYS || align=right data-sort-value="0.87" | 870 m || 
|-id=731 bgcolor=#fefefe
| 251731 ||  || — || April 17, 1998 || Kitt Peak || Spacewatch || — || align=right | 1.3 km || 
|-id=732 bgcolor=#FFC2E0
| 251732 ||  || — || April 27, 1998 || Kitt Peak || Spacewatch || AMO || align=right data-sort-value="0.17" | 170 m || 
|-id=733 bgcolor=#d6d6d6
| 251733 ||  || — || April 21, 1998 || Socorro || LINEAR || — || align=right | 4.9 km || 
|-id=734 bgcolor=#fefefe
| 251734 ||  || — || May 27, 1998 || Kitt Peak || Spacewatch || H || align=right data-sort-value="0.61" | 610 m || 
|-id=735 bgcolor=#d6d6d6
| 251735 ||  || — || June 17, 1998 || Kitt Peak || Spacewatch || — || align=right | 5.8 km || 
|-id=736 bgcolor=#d6d6d6
| 251736 ||  || — || June 27, 1998 || Kitt Peak || Spacewatch || — || align=right | 4.7 km || 
|-id=737 bgcolor=#fefefe
| 251737 ||  || — || August 26, 1998 || Xinglong || SCAP || — || align=right | 1.0 km || 
|-id=738 bgcolor=#d6d6d6
| 251738 ||  || — || August 24, 1998 || Socorro || LINEAR || TIR || align=right | 5.5 km || 
|-id=739 bgcolor=#d6d6d6
| 251739 ||  || — || September 18, 1998 || Kitt Peak || Spacewatch || — || align=right | 4.7 km || 
|-id=740 bgcolor=#E9E9E9
| 251740 ||  || — || October 14, 1998 || Anderson Mesa || LONEOS || JUN || align=right | 1.7 km || 
|-id=741 bgcolor=#fefefe
| 251741 ||  || — || October 17, 1998 || Kitt Peak || Spacewatch || MAS || align=right | 1.2 km || 
|-id=742 bgcolor=#C2FFFF
| 251742 ||  || — || November 14, 1998 || Kitt Peak || Spacewatch || L4 || align=right | 11 km || 
|-id=743 bgcolor=#C2FFFF
| 251743 ||  || — || November 18, 1998 || Kitt Peak || M. W. Buie || L4 || align=right | 9.4 km || 
|-id=744 bgcolor=#C2FFFF
| 251744 ||  || — || November 19, 1998 || Kitt Peak || M. W. Buie || L4 || align=right | 9.0 km || 
|-id=745 bgcolor=#fefefe
| 251745 ||  || — || November 19, 1998 || Kitt Peak || Spacewatch || — || align=right | 1.5 km || 
|-id=746 bgcolor=#E9E9E9
| 251746 ||  || — || November 22, 1998 || Kitt Peak || Spacewatch || — || align=right | 1.4 km || 
|-id=747 bgcolor=#E9E9E9
| 251747 ||  || — || December 8, 1998 || Kitt Peak || Spacewatch || — || align=right | 1.2 km || 
|-id=748 bgcolor=#E9E9E9
| 251748 ||  || — || December 15, 1998 || Caussols || ODAS || — || align=right | 3.5 km || 
|-id=749 bgcolor=#E9E9E9
| 251749 ||  || — || December 14, 1998 || Socorro || LINEAR || MIT || align=right | 3.0 km || 
|-id=750 bgcolor=#E9E9E9
| 251750 ||  || — || December 26, 1998 || Kitt Peak || Spacewatch || — || align=right | 1.9 km || 
|-id=751 bgcolor=#E9E9E9
| 251751 ||  || — || January 7, 1999 || Kitt Peak || Spacewatch || — || align=right | 1.9 km || 
|-id=752 bgcolor=#E9E9E9
| 251752 ||  || — || January 7, 1999 || Kitt Peak || Spacewatch || — || align=right | 1.6 km || 
|-id=753 bgcolor=#E9E9E9
| 251753 ||  || — || January 8, 1999 || Kitt Peak || Spacewatch || — || align=right | 1.4 km || 
|-id=754 bgcolor=#E9E9E9
| 251754 ||  || — || January 11, 1999 || Kitt Peak || Spacewatch || — || align=right | 2.3 km || 
|-id=755 bgcolor=#E9E9E9
| 251755 ||  || — || February 10, 1999 || Socorro || LINEAR || RAF || align=right | 1.7 km || 
|-id=756 bgcolor=#E9E9E9
| 251756 ||  || — || February 10, 1999 || Socorro || LINEAR || — || align=right | 1.9 km || 
|-id=757 bgcolor=#E9E9E9
| 251757 ||  || — || February 12, 1999 || Socorro || LINEAR || — || align=right | 1.8 km || 
|-id=758 bgcolor=#E9E9E9
| 251758 ||  || — || February 12, 1999 || Socorro || LINEAR || — || align=right | 2.7 km || 
|-id=759 bgcolor=#E9E9E9
| 251759 ||  || — || February 8, 1999 || Kitt Peak || Spacewatch || — || align=right | 2.5 km || 
|-id=760 bgcolor=#E9E9E9
| 251760 ||  || — || March 16, 1999 || Kitt Peak || Spacewatch || — || align=right | 1.8 km || 
|-id=761 bgcolor=#E9E9E9
| 251761 ||  || — || March 17, 1999 || Caussols || ODAS || — || align=right | 3.7 km || 
|-id=762 bgcolor=#E9E9E9
| 251762 ||  || — || March 18, 1999 || Kitt Peak || Spacewatch || — || align=right | 2.5 km || 
|-id=763 bgcolor=#E9E9E9
| 251763 ||  || — || March 23, 1999 || Kitt Peak || Spacewatch || — || align=right | 2.7 km || 
|-id=764 bgcolor=#fefefe
| 251764 ||  || — || April 9, 1999 || Anderson Mesa || LONEOS || — || align=right | 1.1 km || 
|-id=765 bgcolor=#E9E9E9
| 251765 ||  || — || May 10, 1999 || Socorro || LINEAR || — || align=right | 3.4 km || 
|-id=766 bgcolor=#fefefe
| 251766 ||  || — || May 10, 1999 || Socorro || LINEAR || H || align=right data-sort-value="0.90" | 900 m || 
|-id=767 bgcolor=#fefefe
| 251767 ||  || — || May 13, 1999 || Socorro || LINEAR || — || align=right | 1.6 km || 
|-id=768 bgcolor=#fefefe
| 251768 ||  || — || May 12, 1999 || Socorro || LINEAR || FLO || align=right data-sort-value="0.89" | 890 m || 
|-id=769 bgcolor=#fefefe
| 251769 ||  || — || July 12, 1999 || Socorro || LINEAR || — || align=right | 3.9 km || 
|-id=770 bgcolor=#d6d6d6
| 251770 ||  || — || July 13, 1999 || Socorro || LINEAR || — || align=right | 5.4 km || 
|-id=771 bgcolor=#fefefe
| 251771 ||  || — || September 6, 1999 || Catalina || CSS || — || align=right | 3.6 km || 
|-id=772 bgcolor=#d6d6d6
| 251772 ||  || — || September 3, 1999 || Kitt Peak || Spacewatch || — || align=right | 2.6 km || 
|-id=773 bgcolor=#d6d6d6
| 251773 ||  || — || September 3, 1999 || Kitt Peak || Spacewatch || — || align=right | 3.3 km || 
|-id=774 bgcolor=#FA8072
| 251774 ||  || — || September 7, 1999 || Socorro || LINEAR || — || align=right | 2.6 km || 
|-id=775 bgcolor=#fefefe
| 251775 ||  || — || September 7, 1999 || Socorro || LINEAR || — || align=right | 1.0 km || 
|-id=776 bgcolor=#fefefe
| 251776 ||  || — || September 7, 1999 || Socorro || LINEAR || — || align=right | 1.1 km || 
|-id=777 bgcolor=#fefefe
| 251777 ||  || — || September 7, 1999 || Socorro || LINEAR || — || align=right | 1.1 km || 
|-id=778 bgcolor=#fefefe
| 251778 ||  || — || September 7, 1999 || Socorro || LINEAR || NYS || align=right | 1.0 km || 
|-id=779 bgcolor=#d6d6d6
| 251779 ||  || — || September 7, 1999 || Socorro || LINEAR || — || align=right | 2.9 km || 
|-id=780 bgcolor=#fefefe
| 251780 ||  || — || September 7, 1999 || Socorro || LINEAR || — || align=right | 1.4 km || 
|-id=781 bgcolor=#fefefe
| 251781 ||  || — || September 8, 1999 || Socorro || LINEAR || — || align=right | 1.3 km || 
|-id=782 bgcolor=#d6d6d6
| 251782 ||  || — || September 9, 1999 || Socorro || LINEAR || EUP || align=right | 5.3 km || 
|-id=783 bgcolor=#fefefe
| 251783 ||  || — || September 9, 1999 || Socorro || LINEAR || — || align=right data-sort-value="0.99" | 990 m || 
|-id=784 bgcolor=#fefefe
| 251784 ||  || — || September 9, 1999 || Socorro || LINEAR || V || align=right data-sort-value="0.86" | 860 m || 
|-id=785 bgcolor=#d6d6d6
| 251785 ||  || — || September 9, 1999 || Socorro || LINEAR || — || align=right | 3.6 km || 
|-id=786 bgcolor=#d6d6d6
| 251786 ||  || — || September 8, 1999 || Socorro || LINEAR || — || align=right | 5.1 km || 
|-id=787 bgcolor=#fefefe
| 251787 ||  || — || September 8, 1999 || Socorro || LINEAR || — || align=right | 1.3 km || 
|-id=788 bgcolor=#fefefe
| 251788 ||  || — || September 8, 1999 || Socorro || LINEAR || — || align=right | 1.5 km || 
|-id=789 bgcolor=#fefefe
| 251789 ||  || — || September 7, 1999 || Catalina || CSS || V || align=right data-sort-value="0.94" | 940 m || 
|-id=790 bgcolor=#fefefe
| 251790 ||  || — || September 8, 1999 || Catalina || CSS || — || align=right data-sort-value="0.97" | 970 m || 
|-id=791 bgcolor=#d6d6d6
| 251791 ||  || — || September 30, 1999 || Catalina || CSS || — || align=right | 3.8 km || 
|-id=792 bgcolor=#fefefe
| 251792 ||  || — || September 30, 1999 || Kitt Peak || Spacewatch || FLO || align=right data-sort-value="0.69" | 690 m || 
|-id=793 bgcolor=#fefefe
| 251793 ||  || — || September 30, 1999 || Kitt Peak || Spacewatch || — || align=right | 1.1 km || 
|-id=794 bgcolor=#fefefe
| 251794 ||  || — || September 30, 1999 || Kitt Peak || Spacewatch || V || align=right data-sort-value="0.81" | 810 m || 
|-id=795 bgcolor=#fefefe
| 251795 ||  || — || October 2, 1999 || Kitt Peak || Spacewatch || — || align=right | 1.2 km || 
|-id=796 bgcolor=#fefefe
| 251796 ||  || — || October 8, 1999 || Višnjan Observatory || K. Korlević, M. Jurić || ERI || align=right | 3.1 km || 
|-id=797 bgcolor=#d6d6d6
| 251797 ||  || — || October 2, 1999 || Kitt Peak || Spacewatch || — || align=right | 3.9 km || 
|-id=798 bgcolor=#fefefe
| 251798 ||  || — || October 4, 1999 || Socorro || LINEAR || H || align=right data-sort-value="0.82" | 820 m || 
|-id=799 bgcolor=#d6d6d6
| 251799 ||  || — || October 12, 1999 || Anderson Mesa || LONEOS || — || align=right | 3.4 km || 
|-id=800 bgcolor=#d6d6d6
| 251800 ||  || — || October 1, 1999 || Catalina || CSS || MEL || align=right | 4.2 km || 
|}

251801–251900 

|-bgcolor=#d6d6d6
| 251801 ||  || — || October 4, 1999 || Kitt Peak || Spacewatch || HYG || align=right | 3.7 km || 
|-id=802 bgcolor=#d6d6d6
| 251802 ||  || — || October 4, 1999 || Kitt Peak || Spacewatch || VER || align=right | 2.9 km || 
|-id=803 bgcolor=#d6d6d6
| 251803 ||  || — || October 4, 1999 || Kitt Peak || Spacewatch || — || align=right | 4.4 km || 
|-id=804 bgcolor=#d6d6d6
| 251804 ||  || — || October 6, 1999 || Kitt Peak || Spacewatch || TIR || align=right | 3.3 km || 
|-id=805 bgcolor=#d6d6d6
| 251805 ||  || — || October 6, 1999 || Kitt Peak || Spacewatch || — || align=right | 4.2 km || 
|-id=806 bgcolor=#fefefe
| 251806 ||  || — || October 7, 1999 || Kitt Peak || Spacewatch || V || align=right data-sort-value="0.71" | 710 m || 
|-id=807 bgcolor=#fefefe
| 251807 ||  || — || October 7, 1999 || Kitt Peak || Spacewatch || — || align=right data-sort-value="0.99" | 990 m || 
|-id=808 bgcolor=#d6d6d6
| 251808 ||  || — || October 7, 1999 || Kitt Peak || Spacewatch || — || align=right | 3.0 km || 
|-id=809 bgcolor=#d6d6d6
| 251809 ||  || — || October 7, 1999 || Kitt Peak || Spacewatch || LIX || align=right | 4.6 km || 
|-id=810 bgcolor=#fefefe
| 251810 ||  || — || October 8, 1999 || Kitt Peak || Spacewatch || NYS || align=right data-sort-value="0.85" | 850 m || 
|-id=811 bgcolor=#fefefe
| 251811 ||  || — || October 10, 1999 || Kitt Peak || Spacewatch || MAS || align=right data-sort-value="0.86" | 860 m || 
|-id=812 bgcolor=#d6d6d6
| 251812 ||  || — || October 10, 1999 || Kitt Peak || Spacewatch || THM || align=right | 2.5 km || 
|-id=813 bgcolor=#fefefe
| 251813 ||  || — || October 10, 1999 || Kitt Peak || Spacewatch || NYS || align=right data-sort-value="0.70" | 700 m || 
|-id=814 bgcolor=#fefefe
| 251814 ||  || — || October 10, 1999 || Kitt Peak || Spacewatch || NYS || align=right data-sort-value="0.66" | 660 m || 
|-id=815 bgcolor=#fefefe
| 251815 ||  || — || October 11, 1999 || Kitt Peak || Spacewatch || — || align=right | 1.2 km || 
|-id=816 bgcolor=#FA8072
| 251816 ||  || — || October 12, 1999 || Kitt Peak || Spacewatch || — || align=right data-sort-value="0.65" | 650 m || 
|-id=817 bgcolor=#fefefe
| 251817 ||  || — || October 2, 1999 || Socorro || LINEAR || NYS || align=right data-sort-value="0.97" | 970 m || 
|-id=818 bgcolor=#fefefe
| 251818 ||  || — || October 4, 1999 || Socorro || LINEAR || — || align=right | 1.0 km || 
|-id=819 bgcolor=#fefefe
| 251819 ||  || — || October 6, 1999 || Socorro || LINEAR || V || align=right data-sort-value="0.87" | 870 m || 
|-id=820 bgcolor=#d6d6d6
| 251820 ||  || — || October 7, 1999 || Socorro || LINEAR || — || align=right | 3.8 km || 
|-id=821 bgcolor=#fefefe
| 251821 ||  || — || October 9, 1999 || Socorro || LINEAR || — || align=right | 1.2 km || 
|-id=822 bgcolor=#fefefe
| 251822 ||  || — || October 10, 1999 || Socorro || LINEAR || — || align=right | 1.1 km || 
|-id=823 bgcolor=#fefefe
| 251823 ||  || — || October 10, 1999 || Socorro || LINEAR || V || align=right data-sort-value="0.89" | 890 m || 
|-id=824 bgcolor=#fefefe
| 251824 ||  || — || October 10, 1999 || Socorro || LINEAR || MAS || align=right data-sort-value="0.80" | 800 m || 
|-id=825 bgcolor=#d6d6d6
| 251825 ||  || — || October 10, 1999 || Socorro || LINEAR || — || align=right | 4.1 km || 
|-id=826 bgcolor=#fefefe
| 251826 ||  || — || October 10, 1999 || Socorro || LINEAR || V || align=right data-sort-value="0.87" | 870 m || 
|-id=827 bgcolor=#d6d6d6
| 251827 ||  || — || October 12, 1999 || Socorro || LINEAR || — || align=right | 4.4 km || 
|-id=828 bgcolor=#fefefe
| 251828 ||  || — || October 12, 1999 || Socorro || LINEAR || — || align=right | 2.3 km || 
|-id=829 bgcolor=#fefefe
| 251829 ||  || — || October 12, 1999 || Socorro || LINEAR || — || align=right | 1.6 km || 
|-id=830 bgcolor=#d6d6d6
| 251830 ||  || — || October 12, 1999 || Socorro || LINEAR || ALA || align=right | 4.9 km || 
|-id=831 bgcolor=#d6d6d6
| 251831 ||  || — || October 13, 1999 || Socorro || LINEAR || — || align=right | 3.8 km || 
|-id=832 bgcolor=#d6d6d6
| 251832 ||  || — || October 14, 1999 || Socorro || LINEAR || — || align=right | 3.8 km || 
|-id=833 bgcolor=#fefefe
| 251833 ||  || — || October 15, 1999 || Socorro || LINEAR || — || align=right | 1.1 km || 
|-id=834 bgcolor=#fefefe
| 251834 ||  || — || October 15, 1999 || Socorro || LINEAR || — || align=right | 1.1 km || 
|-id=835 bgcolor=#d6d6d6
| 251835 ||  || — || October 15, 1999 || Socorro || LINEAR || URS || align=right | 5.3 km || 
|-id=836 bgcolor=#d6d6d6
| 251836 ||  || — || October 15, 1999 || Socorro || LINEAR || — || align=right | 4.6 km || 
|-id=837 bgcolor=#fefefe
| 251837 ||  || — || October 15, 1999 || Socorro || LINEAR || — || align=right data-sort-value="0.89" | 890 m || 
|-id=838 bgcolor=#d6d6d6
| 251838 ||  || — || October 6, 1999 || Socorro || LINEAR || — || align=right | 4.1 km || 
|-id=839 bgcolor=#fefefe
| 251839 ||  || — || October 9, 1999 || Catalina || CSS || — || align=right | 1.1 km || 
|-id=840 bgcolor=#fefefe
| 251840 ||  || — || October 9, 1999 || Kitt Peak || Spacewatch || — || align=right data-sort-value="0.66" | 660 m || 
|-id=841 bgcolor=#fefefe
| 251841 ||  || — || October 9, 1999 || Socorro || LINEAR || MAS || align=right data-sort-value="0.90" | 900 m || 
|-id=842 bgcolor=#d6d6d6
| 251842 ||  || — || October 13, 1999 || Socorro || LINEAR || VER || align=right | 3.2 km || 
|-id=843 bgcolor=#d6d6d6
| 251843 ||  || — || October 15, 1999 || Kitt Peak || Spacewatch || — || align=right | 3.1 km || 
|-id=844 bgcolor=#d6d6d6
| 251844 ||  || — || October 3, 1999 || Socorro || LINEAR || — || align=right | 4.4 km || 
|-id=845 bgcolor=#fefefe
| 251845 ||  || — || October 3, 1999 || Socorro || LINEAR || CHL || align=right | 3.3 km || 
|-id=846 bgcolor=#d6d6d6
| 251846 ||  || — || October 1, 1999 || Kitt Peak || Spacewatch || — || align=right | 3.7 km || 
|-id=847 bgcolor=#fefefe
| 251847 ||  || — || October 1, 1999 || Catalina || CSS || V || align=right data-sort-value="0.89" | 890 m || 
|-id=848 bgcolor=#d6d6d6
| 251848 ||  || — || October 6, 1999 || Socorro || LINEAR || EOS || align=right | 2.6 km || 
|-id=849 bgcolor=#d6d6d6
| 251849 ||  || — || October 8, 1999 || Kitt Peak || Spacewatch || HYG || align=right | 2.9 km || 
|-id=850 bgcolor=#d6d6d6
| 251850 ||  || — || October 12, 1999 || Socorro || LINEAR || EOS || align=right | 2.8 km || 
|-id=851 bgcolor=#d6d6d6
| 251851 ||  || — || October 13, 1999 || Apache Point || SDSS || — || align=right | 3.0 km || 
|-id=852 bgcolor=#fefefe
| 251852 ||  || — || October 31, 1999 || Socorro || LINEAR || H || align=right | 1.3 km || 
|-id=853 bgcolor=#fefefe
| 251853 ||  || — || October 29, 1999 || Catalina || CSS || — || align=right | 1.0 km || 
|-id=854 bgcolor=#d6d6d6
| 251854 ||  || — || October 31, 1999 || Kitt Peak || Spacewatch || — || align=right | 3.5 km || 
|-id=855 bgcolor=#d6d6d6
| 251855 ||  || — || October 31, 1999 || Kitt Peak || Spacewatch || — || align=right | 3.0 km || 
|-id=856 bgcolor=#d6d6d6
| 251856 ||  || — || October 31, 1999 || Kitt Peak || Spacewatch || THM || align=right | 3.1 km || 
|-id=857 bgcolor=#d6d6d6
| 251857 ||  || — || October 31, 1999 || Kitt Peak || Spacewatch || THM || align=right | 2.2 km || 
|-id=858 bgcolor=#fefefe
| 251858 ||  || — || October 31, 1999 || Kitt Peak || Spacewatch || MAS || align=right | 1.0 km || 
|-id=859 bgcolor=#d6d6d6
| 251859 ||  || — || October 31, 1999 || Kitt Peak || Spacewatch || — || align=right | 4.7 km || 
|-id=860 bgcolor=#d6d6d6
| 251860 ||  || — || October 31, 1999 || Kitt Peak || Spacewatch || THM || align=right | 2.9 km || 
|-id=861 bgcolor=#fefefe
| 251861 ||  || — || October 31, 1999 || Kitt Peak || Spacewatch || NYS || align=right data-sort-value="0.73" | 730 m || 
|-id=862 bgcolor=#fefefe
| 251862 ||  || — || October 16, 1999 || Socorro || LINEAR || — || align=right | 1.1 km || 
|-id=863 bgcolor=#fefefe
| 251863 ||  || — || October 19, 1999 || Kitt Peak || Spacewatch || — || align=right data-sort-value="0.64" | 640 m || 
|-id=864 bgcolor=#d6d6d6
| 251864 ||  || — || October 30, 1999 || Socorro || LINEAR || — || align=right | 4.6 km || 
|-id=865 bgcolor=#fefefe
| 251865 ||  || — || November 1, 1999 || Socorro || LINEAR || H || align=right | 1.0 km || 
|-id=866 bgcolor=#fefefe
| 251866 ||  || — || November 2, 1999 || Socorro || LINEAR || H || align=right | 1.0 km || 
|-id=867 bgcolor=#fefefe
| 251867 ||  || — || November 2, 1999 || Kitt Peak || Spacewatch || NYS || align=right data-sort-value="0.81" | 810 m || 
|-id=868 bgcolor=#fefefe
| 251868 ||  || — || November 2, 1999 || Kitt Peak || Spacewatch || — || align=right | 1.2 km || 
|-id=869 bgcolor=#fefefe
| 251869 ||  || — || November 2, 1999 || Kitt Peak || Spacewatch || — || align=right | 1.1 km || 
|-id=870 bgcolor=#fefefe
| 251870 ||  || — || November 2, 1999 || Kitt Peak || Spacewatch || V || align=right data-sort-value="0.73" | 730 m || 
|-id=871 bgcolor=#d6d6d6
| 251871 ||  || — || November 2, 1999 || Kitt Peak || Spacewatch || — || align=right | 4.5 km || 
|-id=872 bgcolor=#fefefe
| 251872 ||  || — || November 2, 1999 || Kitt Peak || Spacewatch || NYS || align=right data-sort-value="0.73" | 730 m || 
|-id=873 bgcolor=#fefefe
| 251873 ||  || — || November 3, 1999 || Socorro || LINEAR || — || align=right | 1.2 km || 
|-id=874 bgcolor=#fefefe
| 251874 ||  || — || November 4, 1999 || Kitt Peak || Spacewatch || NYS || align=right data-sort-value="0.59" | 590 m || 
|-id=875 bgcolor=#fefefe
| 251875 ||  || — || November 4, 1999 || Catalina || CSS || V || align=right data-sort-value="0.89" | 890 m || 
|-id=876 bgcolor=#d6d6d6
| 251876 ||  || — || November 3, 1999 || Socorro || LINEAR || EUP || align=right | 4.9 km || 
|-id=877 bgcolor=#d6d6d6
| 251877 ||  || — || November 3, 1999 || Socorro || LINEAR || — || align=right | 4.3 km || 
|-id=878 bgcolor=#d6d6d6
| 251878 ||  || — || November 4, 1999 || Socorro || LINEAR || — || align=right | 4.8 km || 
|-id=879 bgcolor=#fefefe
| 251879 ||  || — || November 4, 1999 || Socorro || LINEAR || NYS || align=right data-sort-value="0.72" | 720 m || 
|-id=880 bgcolor=#fefefe
| 251880 ||  || — || November 4, 1999 || Socorro || LINEAR || — || align=right | 1.2 km || 
|-id=881 bgcolor=#d6d6d6
| 251881 ||  || — || November 4, 1999 || Socorro || LINEAR || — || align=right | 4.6 km || 
|-id=882 bgcolor=#fefefe
| 251882 ||  || — || November 1, 1999 || Kitt Peak || Spacewatch || NYS || align=right data-sort-value="0.66" | 660 m || 
|-id=883 bgcolor=#fefefe
| 251883 ||  || — || November 5, 1999 || Kitt Peak || Spacewatch || MAS || align=right data-sort-value="0.87" | 870 m || 
|-id=884 bgcolor=#fefefe
| 251884 ||  || — || November 5, 1999 || Kitt Peak || Spacewatch || MAS || align=right data-sort-value="0.72" | 720 m || 
|-id=885 bgcolor=#fefefe
| 251885 ||  || — || November 4, 1999 || Socorro || LINEAR || H || align=right data-sort-value="0.70" | 700 m || 
|-id=886 bgcolor=#d6d6d6
| 251886 ||  || — || November 7, 1999 || Socorro || LINEAR || — || align=right | 4.8 km || 
|-id=887 bgcolor=#fefefe
| 251887 ||  || — || November 5, 1999 || Socorro || LINEAR || — || align=right data-sort-value="0.93" | 930 m || 
|-id=888 bgcolor=#d6d6d6
| 251888 ||  || — || November 9, 1999 || Socorro || LINEAR || — || align=right | 3.6 km || 
|-id=889 bgcolor=#d6d6d6
| 251889 ||  || — || November 9, 1999 || Socorro || LINEAR || TIR || align=right | 4.3 km || 
|-id=890 bgcolor=#fefefe
| 251890 ||  || — || November 9, 1999 || Socorro || LINEAR || — || align=right data-sort-value="0.99" | 990 m || 
|-id=891 bgcolor=#d6d6d6
| 251891 ||  || — || November 9, 1999 || Socorro || LINEAR || — || align=right | 4.3 km || 
|-id=892 bgcolor=#d6d6d6
| 251892 ||  || — || November 9, 1999 || Socorro || LINEAR || THM || align=right | 2.4 km || 
|-id=893 bgcolor=#fefefe
| 251893 ||  || — || November 9, 1999 || Socorro || LINEAR || — || align=right | 1.0 km || 
|-id=894 bgcolor=#d6d6d6
| 251894 ||  || — || November 9, 1999 || Socorro || LINEAR || VER || align=right | 4.1 km || 
|-id=895 bgcolor=#d6d6d6
| 251895 ||  || — || November 9, 1999 || Socorro || LINEAR || — || align=right | 3.5 km || 
|-id=896 bgcolor=#d6d6d6
| 251896 ||  || — || November 9, 1999 || Socorro || LINEAR || — || align=right | 7.5 km || 
|-id=897 bgcolor=#d6d6d6
| 251897 ||  || — || November 9, 1999 || Socorro || LINEAR || — || align=right | 5.3 km || 
|-id=898 bgcolor=#d6d6d6
| 251898 ||  || — || November 9, 1999 || Socorro || LINEAR || EUP || align=right | 5.1 km || 
|-id=899 bgcolor=#d6d6d6
| 251899 ||  || — || November 4, 1999 || Kitt Peak || Spacewatch || — || align=right | 3.0 km || 
|-id=900 bgcolor=#d6d6d6
| 251900 ||  || — || November 4, 1999 || Kitt Peak || Spacewatch || — || align=right | 4.7 km || 
|}

251901–252000 

|-bgcolor=#fefefe
| 251901 ||  || — || November 4, 1999 || Kitt Peak || Spacewatch || — || align=right | 1.0 km || 
|-id=902 bgcolor=#fefefe
| 251902 ||  || — || November 4, 1999 || Kitt Peak || Spacewatch || NYS || align=right data-sort-value="0.74" | 740 m || 
|-id=903 bgcolor=#d6d6d6
| 251903 ||  || — || November 4, 1999 || Kitt Peak || Spacewatch || — || align=right | 3.0 km || 
|-id=904 bgcolor=#d6d6d6
| 251904 ||  || — || November 5, 1999 || Kitt Peak || Spacewatch || — || align=right | 4.2 km || 
|-id=905 bgcolor=#d6d6d6
| 251905 ||  || — || November 10, 1999 || Kitt Peak || Spacewatch || EOS || align=right | 2.8 km || 
|-id=906 bgcolor=#fefefe
| 251906 ||  || — || November 10, 1999 || Kitt Peak || Spacewatch || — || align=right data-sort-value="0.94" | 940 m || 
|-id=907 bgcolor=#d6d6d6
| 251907 ||  || — || November 12, 1999 || Socorro || LINEAR || EOS || align=right | 3.1 km || 
|-id=908 bgcolor=#fefefe
| 251908 ||  || — || November 10, 1999 || Kitt Peak || Spacewatch || — || align=right data-sort-value="0.99" | 990 m || 
|-id=909 bgcolor=#fefefe
| 251909 ||  || — || November 14, 1999 || Kitt Peak || Spacewatch || — || align=right | 1.1 km || 
|-id=910 bgcolor=#d6d6d6
| 251910 ||  || — || November 12, 1999 || Socorro || LINEAR || — || align=right | 4.4 km || 
|-id=911 bgcolor=#d6d6d6
| 251911 ||  || — || November 14, 1999 || Socorro || LINEAR || — || align=right | 3.8 km || 
|-id=912 bgcolor=#d6d6d6
| 251912 ||  || — || November 14, 1999 || Socorro || LINEAR || — || align=right | 3.6 km || 
|-id=913 bgcolor=#d6d6d6
| 251913 ||  || — || November 11, 1999 || Kitt Peak || Spacewatch || — || align=right | 3.7 km || 
|-id=914 bgcolor=#fefefe
| 251914 ||  || — || November 12, 1999 || Kitt Peak || Spacewatch || MAS || align=right data-sort-value="0.89" | 890 m || 
|-id=915 bgcolor=#d6d6d6
| 251915 ||  || — || November 15, 1999 || Kitt Peak || Spacewatch || — || align=right | 3.2 km || 
|-id=916 bgcolor=#fefefe
| 251916 ||  || — || November 9, 1999 || Socorro || LINEAR || NYS || align=right | 1.0 km || 
|-id=917 bgcolor=#fefefe
| 251917 ||  || — || November 12, 1999 || Socorro || LINEAR || V || align=right data-sort-value="0.75" | 750 m || 
|-id=918 bgcolor=#fefefe
| 251918 ||  || — || November 14, 1999 || Socorro || LINEAR || — || align=right | 2.2 km || 
|-id=919 bgcolor=#d6d6d6
| 251919 ||  || — || November 14, 1999 || Socorro || LINEAR || — || align=right | 4.5 km || 
|-id=920 bgcolor=#d6d6d6
| 251920 ||  || — || November 14, 1999 || Socorro || LINEAR || — || align=right | 6.2 km || 
|-id=921 bgcolor=#d6d6d6
| 251921 ||  || — || November 6, 1999 || Socorro || LINEAR || EUP || align=right | 6.0 km || 
|-id=922 bgcolor=#d6d6d6
| 251922 ||  || — || November 1, 1999 || Catalina || CSS || — || align=right | 6.8 km || 
|-id=923 bgcolor=#fefefe
| 251923 ||  || — || November 3, 1999 || Catalina || CSS || — || align=right | 1.1 km || 
|-id=924 bgcolor=#fefefe
| 251924 ||  || — || November 3, 1999 || Anderson Mesa || LONEOS || NYS || align=right data-sort-value="0.74" | 740 m || 
|-id=925 bgcolor=#d6d6d6
| 251925 ||  || — || November 10, 1999 || Kitt Peak || Spacewatch || URS || align=right | 3.6 km || 
|-id=926 bgcolor=#d6d6d6
| 251926 ||  || — || November 10, 1999 || Kitt Peak || Spacewatch || HYG || align=right | 4.2 km || 
|-id=927 bgcolor=#fefefe
| 251927 ||  || — || November 12, 1999 || Socorro || LINEAR || — || align=right | 1.2 km || 
|-id=928 bgcolor=#d6d6d6
| 251928 ||  || — || November 9, 1999 || Catalina || CSS || — || align=right | 4.7 km || 
|-id=929 bgcolor=#fefefe
| 251929 ||  || — || November 14, 1999 || Socorro || LINEAR || MAS || align=right | 1.0 km || 
|-id=930 bgcolor=#d6d6d6
| 251930 ||  || — || November 12, 1999 || Socorro || LINEAR || — || align=right | 2.3 km || 
|-id=931 bgcolor=#d6d6d6
| 251931 ||  || — || November 13, 1999 || Catalina || CSS || — || align=right | 4.3 km || 
|-id=932 bgcolor=#d6d6d6
| 251932 ||  || — || November 13, 1999 || Catalina || CSS || HYG || align=right | 4.6 km || 
|-id=933 bgcolor=#fefefe
| 251933 ||  || — || November 1, 1999 || Kitt Peak || Spacewatch || — || align=right data-sort-value="0.80" | 800 m || 
|-id=934 bgcolor=#d6d6d6
| 251934 ||  || — || November 5, 1999 || Socorro || LINEAR || EUP || align=right | 5.5 km || 
|-id=935 bgcolor=#fefefe
| 251935 ||  || — || November 5, 1999 || Kitt Peak || Spacewatch || V || align=right data-sort-value="0.95" | 950 m || 
|-id=936 bgcolor=#fefefe
| 251936 ||  || — || November 5, 1999 || Socorro || LINEAR || H || align=right data-sort-value="0.75" | 750 m || 
|-id=937 bgcolor=#d6d6d6
| 251937 ||  || — || November 29, 1999 || Monte Agliale || S. Donati || — || align=right | 5.6 km || 
|-id=938 bgcolor=#d6d6d6
| 251938 ||  || — || November 30, 1999 || Kitt Peak || Spacewatch || — || align=right | 3.6 km || 
|-id=939 bgcolor=#fefefe
| 251939 ||  || — || November 28, 1999 || Kitt Peak || Spacewatch || — || align=right data-sort-value="0.90" | 900 m || 
|-id=940 bgcolor=#fefefe
| 251940 ||  || — || November 29, 1999 || Kitt Peak || Spacewatch || NYS || align=right data-sort-value="0.63" | 630 m || 
|-id=941 bgcolor=#fefefe
| 251941 ||  || — || November 30, 1999 || Kitt Peak || Spacewatch || MAS || align=right data-sort-value="0.75" | 750 m || 
|-id=942 bgcolor=#fefefe
| 251942 ||  || — || November 29, 1999 || Kitt Peak || Spacewatch || NYS || align=right data-sort-value="0.71" | 710 m || 
|-id=943 bgcolor=#fefefe
| 251943 ||  || — || December 5, 1999 || Socorro || LINEAR || H || align=right data-sort-value="0.87" | 870 m || 
|-id=944 bgcolor=#d6d6d6
| 251944 ||  || — || December 6, 1999 || Socorro || LINEAR || THB || align=right | 3.8 km || 
|-id=945 bgcolor=#fefefe
| 251945 ||  || — || December 7, 1999 || Socorro || LINEAR || — || align=right | 1.0 km || 
|-id=946 bgcolor=#d6d6d6
| 251946 ||  || — || December 7, 1999 || Socorro || LINEAR || — || align=right | 4.6 km || 
|-id=947 bgcolor=#fefefe
| 251947 ||  || — || December 7, 1999 || Socorro || LINEAR || — || align=right | 1.3 km || 
|-id=948 bgcolor=#d6d6d6
| 251948 ||  || — || December 7, 1999 || Socorro || LINEAR || — || align=right | 6.7 km || 
|-id=949 bgcolor=#d6d6d6
| 251949 ||  || — || December 7, 1999 || Socorro || LINEAR || ALA || align=right | 4.9 km || 
|-id=950 bgcolor=#fefefe
| 251950 ||  || — || December 7, 1999 || Socorro || LINEAR || — || align=right | 1.2 km || 
|-id=951 bgcolor=#fefefe
| 251951 ||  || — || December 7, 1999 || Socorro || LINEAR || NYS || align=right data-sort-value="0.92" | 920 m || 
|-id=952 bgcolor=#d6d6d6
| 251952 ||  || — || December 7, 1999 || Socorro || LINEAR || — || align=right | 4.6 km || 
|-id=953 bgcolor=#d6d6d6
| 251953 ||  || — || December 7, 1999 || Socorro || LINEAR || — || align=right | 5.8 km || 
|-id=954 bgcolor=#fefefe
| 251954 ||  || — || December 4, 1999 || Catalina || CSS || — || align=right | 1.1 km || 
|-id=955 bgcolor=#d6d6d6
| 251955 ||  || — || December 12, 1999 || Socorro || LINEAR || — || align=right | 8.0 km || 
|-id=956 bgcolor=#d6d6d6
| 251956 ||  || — || December 7, 1999 || Kitt Peak || Spacewatch || — || align=right | 5.3 km || 
|-id=957 bgcolor=#d6d6d6
| 251957 ||  || — || December 14, 1999 || Kitt Peak || Spacewatch || HYG || align=right | 4.0 km || 
|-id=958 bgcolor=#d6d6d6
| 251958 ||  || — || December 8, 1999 || Socorro || LINEAR || THM || align=right | 2.9 km || 
|-id=959 bgcolor=#d6d6d6
| 251959 ||  || — || December 3, 1999 || Kitt Peak || Spacewatch || EOS || align=right | 2.6 km || 
|-id=960 bgcolor=#fefefe
| 251960 ||  || — || December 6, 1999 || Kitt Peak || Spacewatch || — || align=right | 1.0 km || 
|-id=961 bgcolor=#fefefe
| 251961 ||  || — || December 12, 1999 || Kitt Peak || Spacewatch || — || align=right | 1.0 km || 
|-id=962 bgcolor=#E9E9E9
| 251962 ||  || — || December 5, 1999 || Kitt Peak || Spacewatch || — || align=right | 1.6 km || 
|-id=963 bgcolor=#d6d6d6
| 251963 ||  || — || December 5, 1999 || Anderson Mesa || LONEOS || THB || align=right | 4.1 km || 
|-id=964 bgcolor=#FA8072
| 251964 ||  || — || December 30, 1999 || Socorro || LINEAR || — || align=right | 1.1 km || 
|-id=965 bgcolor=#d6d6d6
| 251965 ||  || — || December 30, 1999 || Socorro || LINEAR || EUP || align=right | 5.3 km || 
|-id=966 bgcolor=#FA8072
| 251966 ||  || — || January 2, 2000 || Socorro || LINEAR || — || align=right | 2.3 km || 
|-id=967 bgcolor=#fefefe
| 251967 ||  || — || January 5, 2000 || Kitt Peak || Spacewatch || FLO || align=right data-sort-value="0.93" | 930 m || 
|-id=968 bgcolor=#d6d6d6
| 251968 ||  || — || January 5, 2000 || Socorro || LINEAR || — || align=right | 5.5 km || 
|-id=969 bgcolor=#d6d6d6
| 251969 ||  || — || January 5, 2000 || Socorro || LINEAR || — || align=right | 6.5 km || 
|-id=970 bgcolor=#fefefe
| 251970 ||  || — || January 2, 2000 || Socorro || LINEAR || PHO || align=right | 1.7 km || 
|-id=971 bgcolor=#d6d6d6
| 251971 ||  || — || January 8, 2000 || Socorro || LINEAR || 7:4 || align=right | 7.9 km || 
|-id=972 bgcolor=#fefefe
| 251972 ||  || — || January 3, 2000 || Socorro || LINEAR || ERI || align=right | 2.3 km || 
|-id=973 bgcolor=#d6d6d6
| 251973 ||  || — || January 7, 2000 || Socorro || LINEAR || THB || align=right | 4.5 km || 
|-id=974 bgcolor=#fefefe
| 251974 ||  || — || January 8, 2000 || Kitt Peak || Spacewatch || MAS || align=right data-sort-value="0.82" | 820 m || 
|-id=975 bgcolor=#d6d6d6
| 251975 ||  || — || January 8, 2000 || Kitt Peak || Spacewatch || THM || align=right | 2.7 km || 
|-id=976 bgcolor=#d6d6d6
| 251976 ||  || — || January 9, 2000 || Kitt Peak || Spacewatch || — || align=right | 4.1 km || 
|-id=977 bgcolor=#E9E9E9
| 251977 ||  || — || January 12, 2000 || Kitt Peak || Spacewatch || BRG || align=right | 2.1 km || 
|-id=978 bgcolor=#fefefe
| 251978 ||  || — || January 7, 2000 || Socorro || LINEAR || — || align=right | 1.6 km || 
|-id=979 bgcolor=#fefefe
| 251979 ||  || — || January 8, 2000 || Socorro || LINEAR || — || align=right | 1.1 km || 
|-id=980 bgcolor=#E9E9E9
| 251980 ||  || — || January 16, 2000 || Višnjan || K. Korlević || RAF || align=right | 1.6 km || 
|-id=981 bgcolor=#fefefe
| 251981 ||  || — || February 5, 2000 || Socorro || LINEAR || — || align=right | 1.2 km || 
|-id=982 bgcolor=#fefefe
| 251982 ||  || — || February 3, 2000 || Socorro || LINEAR || NYS || align=right | 1.1 km || 
|-id=983 bgcolor=#fefefe
| 251983 ||  || — || February 10, 2000 || Kitt Peak || Spacewatch || NYS || align=right data-sort-value="0.73" | 730 m || 
|-id=984 bgcolor=#E9E9E9
| 251984 ||  || — || February 3, 2000 || Kitt Peak || Spacewatch || — || align=right | 1.6 km || 
|-id=985 bgcolor=#fefefe
| 251985 ||  || — || February 26, 2000 || Kitt Peak || Spacewatch || — || align=right data-sort-value="0.81" | 810 m || 
|-id=986 bgcolor=#E9E9E9
| 251986 ||  || — || February 27, 2000 || Kitt Peak || Spacewatch || — || align=right | 1.9 km || 
|-id=987 bgcolor=#E9E9E9
| 251987 ||  || — || February 27, 2000 || Kitt Peak || Spacewatch || — || align=right | 1.5 km || 
|-id=988 bgcolor=#E9E9E9
| 251988 ||  || — || February 29, 2000 || Socorro || LINEAR || EUN || align=right | 1.9 km || 
|-id=989 bgcolor=#E9E9E9
| 251989 ||  || — || February 29, 2000 || Socorro || LINEAR || — || align=right | 1.6 km || 
|-id=990 bgcolor=#E9E9E9
| 251990 ||  || — || March 8, 2000 || Kitt Peak || Spacewatch || — || align=right | 1.8 km || 
|-id=991 bgcolor=#E9E9E9
| 251991 ||  || — || March 3, 2000 || Kitt Peak || Spacewatch || — || align=right | 1.9 km || 
|-id=992 bgcolor=#E9E9E9
| 251992 ||  || — || March 8, 2000 || Kitt Peak || Spacewatch || — || align=right | 1.6 km || 
|-id=993 bgcolor=#E9E9E9
| 251993 ||  || — || March 10, 2000 || Socorro || LINEAR || EUN || align=right | 1.8 km || 
|-id=994 bgcolor=#E9E9E9
| 251994 ||  || — || March 9, 2000 || Kitt Peak || Spacewatch || — || align=right | 1.4 km || 
|-id=995 bgcolor=#E9E9E9
| 251995 ||  || — || March 9, 2000 || Kitt Peak || Spacewatch || — || align=right | 1.3 km || 
|-id=996 bgcolor=#fefefe
| 251996 ||  || — || March 10, 2000 || Kitt Peak || Spacewatch || — || align=right | 1.2 km || 
|-id=997 bgcolor=#E9E9E9
| 251997 ||  || — || March 10, 2000 || Kitt Peak || Spacewatch || — || align=right | 2.2 km || 
|-id=998 bgcolor=#E9E9E9
| 251998 ||  || — || March 11, 2000 || Anderson Mesa || LONEOS || — || align=right | 2.8 km || 
|-id=999 bgcolor=#E9E9E9
| 251999 ||  || — || March 11, 2000 || Anderson Mesa || LONEOS || — || align=right | 1.3 km || 
|-id=000 bgcolor=#fefefe
| 252000 ||  || — || March 12, 2000 || Catalina || CSS || — || align=right | 1.7 km || 
|}

References

External links 
 Discovery Circumstances: Numbered Minor Planets (250001)–(255000) (IAU Minor Planet Center)

0251